

387001–387100 

|-bgcolor=#E9E9E9
| 387001 ||  || — || October 25, 2008 || Catalina || CSS || — || align=right | 1.5 km || 
|-id=002 bgcolor=#d6d6d6
| 387002 ||  || — || November 21, 2001 || Socorro || LINEAR || — || align=right | 3.4 km || 
|-id=003 bgcolor=#E9E9E9
| 387003 ||  || — || February 25, 2006 || Kitt Peak || Spacewatch || — || align=right | 2.4 km || 
|-id=004 bgcolor=#fefefe
| 387004 ||  || — || March 10, 2007 || Mount Lemmon || Mount Lemmon Survey || NYS || align=right | 1.0 km || 
|-id=005 bgcolor=#fefefe
| 387005 ||  || — || February 15, 2010 || Mount Lemmon || Mount Lemmon Survey || — || align=right | 2.6 km || 
|-id=006 bgcolor=#d6d6d6
| 387006 ||  || — || July 18, 2006 || Siding Spring || SSS || Tj (2.98) || align=right | 4.9 km || 
|-id=007 bgcolor=#fefefe
| 387007 ||  || — || December 7, 2005 || Kitt Peak || Spacewatch || ERI || align=right | 1.9 km || 
|-id=008 bgcolor=#E9E9E9
| 387008 ||  || — || October 25, 2008 || Catalina || CSS || MAR || align=right | 1.8 km || 
|-id=009 bgcolor=#E9E9E9
| 387009 ||  || — || February 14, 2005 || Kitt Peak || Spacewatch || — || align=right | 3.1 km || 
|-id=010 bgcolor=#E9E9E9
| 387010 ||  || — || March 8, 2006 || Kitt Peak || Spacewatch || — || align=right | 2.8 km || 
|-id=011 bgcolor=#fefefe
| 387011 ||  || — || May 26, 2011 || Kitt Peak || Spacewatch || SUL || align=right | 1.9 km || 
|-id=012 bgcolor=#E9E9E9
| 387012 ||  || — || January 31, 2006 || Mount Lemmon || Mount Lemmon Survey || MAR || align=right | 1.2 km || 
|-id=013 bgcolor=#E9E9E9
| 387013 ||  || — || October 30, 2008 || Kitt Peak || Spacewatch || — || align=right | 1.6 km || 
|-id=014 bgcolor=#d6d6d6
| 387014 ||  || — || January 16, 2004 || Kitt Peak || Spacewatch || — || align=right | 2.4 km || 
|-id=015 bgcolor=#d6d6d6
| 387015 ||  || — || September 10, 2001 || Socorro || LINEAR || — || align=right | 3.0 km || 
|-id=016 bgcolor=#E9E9E9
| 387016 ||  || — || September 18, 2003 || Socorro || LINEAR || — || align=right | 2.5 km || 
|-id=017 bgcolor=#E9E9E9
| 387017 ||  || — || September 16, 2003 || Kitt Peak || Spacewatch || HOF || align=right | 2.7 km || 
|-id=018 bgcolor=#fefefe
| 387018 ||  || — || March 10, 2007 || Kitt Peak || Spacewatch || — || align=right | 1.1 km || 
|-id=019 bgcolor=#d6d6d6
| 387019 ||  || — || September 15, 2007 || Kitt Peak || Spacewatch || 628 || align=right | 1.8 km || 
|-id=020 bgcolor=#fefefe
| 387020 ||  || — || June 30, 2008 || Kitt Peak || Spacewatch || — || align=right | 1.3 km || 
|-id=021 bgcolor=#E9E9E9
| 387021 ||  || — || February 24, 2006 || Kitt Peak || Spacewatch || — || align=right | 3.7 km || 
|-id=022 bgcolor=#E9E9E9
| 387022 ||  || — || February 14, 2010 || Mount Lemmon || Mount Lemmon Survey || — || align=right | 1.8 km || 
|-id=023 bgcolor=#d6d6d6
| 387023 ||  || — || September 30, 2006 || Mount Lemmon || Mount Lemmon Survey || THM || align=right | 2.5 km || 
|-id=024 bgcolor=#E9E9E9
| 387024 ||  || — || March 12, 2005 || Kitt Peak || Spacewatch || NEM || align=right | 2.3 km || 
|-id=025 bgcolor=#d6d6d6
| 387025 ||  || — || September 10, 2007 || Mount Lemmon || Mount Lemmon Survey || KAR || align=right | 1.1 km || 
|-id=026 bgcolor=#E9E9E9
| 387026 ||  || — || September 24, 2008 || Catalina || CSS || — || align=right | 1.7 km || 
|-id=027 bgcolor=#E9E9E9
| 387027 ||  || — || October 24, 2008 || Kitt Peak || Spacewatch || — || align=right | 1.5 km || 
|-id=028 bgcolor=#C2FFFF
| 387028 ||  || — || October 17, 2010 || Mount Lemmon || Mount Lemmon Survey || L4 || align=right | 12 km || 
|-id=029 bgcolor=#fefefe
| 387029 ||  || — || March 31, 2003 || Anderson Mesa || LONEOS || V || align=right data-sort-value="0.98" | 980 m || 
|-id=030 bgcolor=#E9E9E9
| 387030 ||  || — || January 13, 2005 || Kitt Peak || Spacewatch || — || align=right | 2.6 km || 
|-id=031 bgcolor=#E9E9E9
| 387031 ||  || — || October 1, 2003 || Kitt Peak || Spacewatch || — || align=right | 2.4 km || 
|-id=032 bgcolor=#E9E9E9
| 387032 ||  || — || October 9, 2004 || Kitt Peak || Spacewatch || — || align=right | 1.1 km || 
|-id=033 bgcolor=#d6d6d6
| 387033 ||  || — || October 8, 2007 || Catalina || CSS || — || align=right | 2.2 km || 
|-id=034 bgcolor=#E9E9E9
| 387034 ||  || — || October 1, 2008 || Mount Lemmon || Mount Lemmon Survey || — || align=right data-sort-value="0.94" | 940 m || 
|-id=035 bgcolor=#E9E9E9
| 387035 ||  || — || September 14, 1999 || Kitt Peak || Spacewatch || — || align=right | 1.4 km || 
|-id=036 bgcolor=#E9E9E9
| 387036 ||  || — || December 16, 2004 || Kitt Peak || Spacewatch || — || align=right | 1.6 km || 
|-id=037 bgcolor=#d6d6d6
| 387037 ||  || — || November 13, 2007 || Mount Lemmon || Mount Lemmon Survey || HYG || align=right | 2.4 km || 
|-id=038 bgcolor=#fefefe
| 387038 ||  || — || September 5, 1999 || Anderson Mesa || LONEOS || — || align=right data-sort-value="0.87" | 870 m || 
|-id=039 bgcolor=#E9E9E9
| 387039 ||  || — || November 6, 2008 || Mount Lemmon || Mount Lemmon Survey || — || align=right | 2.4 km || 
|-id=040 bgcolor=#d6d6d6
| 387040 ||  || — || October 9, 2007 || Catalina || CSS || — || align=right | 2.7 km || 
|-id=041 bgcolor=#E9E9E9
| 387041 ||  || — || September 22, 2008 || Mount Lemmon || Mount Lemmon Survey || — || align=right | 1.3 km || 
|-id=042 bgcolor=#d6d6d6
| 387042 ||  || — || December 20, 2007 || Kitt Peak || Spacewatch || — || align=right | 2.5 km || 
|-id=043 bgcolor=#d6d6d6
| 387043 ||  || — || September 9, 2007 || Kitt Peak || Spacewatch || EOS || align=right | 1.9 km || 
|-id=044 bgcolor=#E9E9E9
| 387044 ||  || — || March 10, 2005 || Mount Lemmon || Mount Lemmon Survey || AGN || align=right | 1.5 km || 
|-id=045 bgcolor=#d6d6d6
| 387045 ||  || — || November 9, 2007 || Kitt Peak || Spacewatch || — || align=right | 2.2 km || 
|-id=046 bgcolor=#E9E9E9
| 387046 ||  || — || April 15, 1997 || Kitt Peak || Spacewatch || — || align=right | 1.9 km || 
|-id=047 bgcolor=#E9E9E9
| 387047 ||  || — || March 24, 2006 || Kitt Peak || Spacewatch || WIT || align=right data-sort-value="0.90" | 900 m || 
|-id=048 bgcolor=#fefefe
| 387048 ||  || — || August 24, 2008 || Kitt Peak || Spacewatch || V || align=right data-sort-value="0.78" | 780 m || 
|-id=049 bgcolor=#fefefe
| 387049 ||  || — || November 23, 2009 || Kitt Peak || Spacewatch || FLO || align=right data-sort-value="0.69" | 690 m || 
|-id=050 bgcolor=#E9E9E9
| 387050 ||  || — || December 1, 2003 || Kitt Peak || Spacewatch || — || align=right | 2.6 km || 
|-id=051 bgcolor=#E9E9E9
| 387051 ||  || — || November 6, 2008 || Kitt Peak || Spacewatch || NEM || align=right | 2.3 km || 
|-id=052 bgcolor=#E9E9E9
| 387052 ||  || — || October 18, 2003 || Kitt Peak || Spacewatch || AGN || align=right | 1.2 km || 
|-id=053 bgcolor=#E9E9E9
| 387053 ||  || — || November 2, 2008 || Mount Lemmon || Mount Lemmon Survey || — || align=right | 1.8 km || 
|-id=054 bgcolor=#E9E9E9
| 387054 ||  || — || April 24, 2006 || Kitt Peak || Spacewatch || AST || align=right | 1.8 km || 
|-id=055 bgcolor=#d6d6d6
| 387055 ||  || — || September 11, 2001 || Kitt Peak || Spacewatch || THM || align=right | 2.4 km || 
|-id=056 bgcolor=#E9E9E9
| 387056 ||  || — || September 27, 2003 || Kitt Peak || Spacewatch || WIT || align=right | 1.1 km || 
|-id=057 bgcolor=#d6d6d6
| 387057 ||  || — || September 11, 2007 || Mount Lemmon || Mount Lemmon Survey || K-2 || align=right | 1.4 km || 
|-id=058 bgcolor=#d6d6d6
| 387058 ||  || — || March 17, 2005 || Kitt Peak || Spacewatch || EOS || align=right | 1.8 km || 
|-id=059 bgcolor=#E9E9E9
| 387059 ||  || — || September 18, 2003 || Kitt Peak || Spacewatch || — || align=right | 1.6 km || 
|-id=060 bgcolor=#fefefe
| 387060 ||  || — || March 9, 1997 || Kitt Peak || Spacewatch || V || align=right data-sort-value="0.50" | 500 m || 
|-id=061 bgcolor=#d6d6d6
| 387061 ||  || — || September 14, 2007 || Mount Lemmon || Mount Lemmon Survey || — || align=right | 2.5 km || 
|-id=062 bgcolor=#E9E9E9
| 387062 ||  || — || October 29, 2008 || Kitt Peak || Spacewatch || — || align=right | 2.0 km || 
|-id=063 bgcolor=#E9E9E9
| 387063 ||  || — || December 11, 2004 || Campo Imperatore || CINEOS || — || align=right | 1.5 km || 
|-id=064 bgcolor=#fefefe
| 387064 ||  || — || September 19, 2001 || Socorro || LINEAR || — || align=right | 1.2 km || 
|-id=065 bgcolor=#E9E9E9
| 387065 ||  || — || August 21, 2007 || Anderson Mesa || LONEOS || HNA || align=right | 2.8 km || 
|-id=066 bgcolor=#fefefe
| 387066 ||  || — || March 15, 2007 || Mount Lemmon || Mount Lemmon Survey || V || align=right data-sort-value="0.82" | 820 m || 
|-id=067 bgcolor=#E9E9E9
| 387067 ||  || — || February 9, 2005 || Mount Lemmon || Mount Lemmon Survey || — || align=right | 2.6 km || 
|-id=068 bgcolor=#E9E9E9
| 387068 ||  || — || August 10, 2007 || Kitt Peak || Spacewatch || HOF || align=right | 2.5 km || 
|-id=069 bgcolor=#E9E9E9
| 387069 ||  || — || October 20, 2008 || Kitt Peak || Spacewatch || — || align=right | 1.5 km || 
|-id=070 bgcolor=#E9E9E9
| 387070 ||  || — || October 1, 2003 || Kitt Peak || Spacewatch || — || align=right | 1.8 km || 
|-id=071 bgcolor=#E9E9E9
| 387071 ||  || — || August 10, 2007 || Kitt Peak || Spacewatch || HEN || align=right data-sort-value="0.95" | 950 m || 
|-id=072 bgcolor=#d6d6d6
| 387072 ||  || — || September 10, 2007 || Mount Lemmon || Mount Lemmon Survey || KOR || align=right | 1.3 km || 
|-id=073 bgcolor=#E9E9E9
| 387073 ||  || — || October 27, 2008 || Kitt Peak || Spacewatch || — || align=right | 1.3 km || 
|-id=074 bgcolor=#E9E9E9
| 387074 ||  || — || September 7, 2004 || Kitt Peak || Spacewatch || — || align=right data-sort-value="0.85" | 850 m || 
|-id=075 bgcolor=#E9E9E9
| 387075 ||  || — || October 25, 2008 || Mount Lemmon || Mount Lemmon Survey || — || align=right | 1.3 km || 
|-id=076 bgcolor=#d6d6d6
| 387076 ||  || — || October 15, 2007 || Mount Lemmon || Mount Lemmon Survey || KOR || align=right | 1.3 km || 
|-id=077 bgcolor=#fefefe
| 387077 ||  || — || November 17, 2009 || Kitt Peak || Spacewatch || NYS || align=right data-sort-value="0.71" | 710 m || 
|-id=078 bgcolor=#E9E9E9
| 387078 ||  || — || January 21, 1996 || Kitt Peak || Spacewatch || — || align=right | 2.3 km || 
|-id=079 bgcolor=#fefefe
| 387079 ||  || — || September 4, 2008 || Kitt Peak || Spacewatch || V || align=right | 1.0 km || 
|-id=080 bgcolor=#E9E9E9
| 387080 ||  || — || September 11, 2007 || Kitt Peak || Spacewatch || — || align=right | 2.1 km || 
|-id=081 bgcolor=#E9E9E9
| 387081 ||  || — || October 21, 2003 || Kitt Peak || Spacewatch || — || align=right | 2.1 km || 
|-id=082 bgcolor=#d6d6d6
| 387082 ||  || — || September 20, 2001 || Kitt Peak || Spacewatch || — || align=right | 2.5 km || 
|-id=083 bgcolor=#E9E9E9
| 387083 ||  || — || October 1, 2003 || Kitt Peak || Spacewatch || PAD || align=right | 1.9 km || 
|-id=084 bgcolor=#E9E9E9
| 387084 ||  || — || November 19, 2003 || Kitt Peak || Spacewatch || WIT || align=right | 1.0 km || 
|-id=085 bgcolor=#d6d6d6
| 387085 ||  || — || September 17, 2006 || Anderson Mesa || LONEOS || EUP || align=right | 4.4 km || 
|-id=086 bgcolor=#E9E9E9
| 387086 ||  || — || October 23, 2003 || Kitt Peak || Spacewatch || NEM || align=right | 2.3 km || 
|-id=087 bgcolor=#E9E9E9
| 387087 ||  || — || January 19, 2005 || Kitt Peak || Spacewatch || — || align=right | 2.0 km || 
|-id=088 bgcolor=#E9E9E9
| 387088 ||  || — || March 9, 2005 || Mount Lemmon || Mount Lemmon Survey || AGN || align=right | 1.2 km || 
|-id=089 bgcolor=#E9E9E9
| 387089 ||  || — || October 19, 2003 || Kitt Peak || Spacewatch || HOF || align=right | 2.9 km || 
|-id=090 bgcolor=#d6d6d6
| 387090 ||  || — || September 23, 1995 || Kitt Peak || Spacewatch || TIR || align=right | 3.3 km || 
|-id=091 bgcolor=#E9E9E9
| 387091 ||  || — || May 1, 2006 || Kitt Peak || Spacewatch || — || align=right | 1.7 km || 
|-id=092 bgcolor=#E9E9E9
| 387092 ||  || — || November 1, 2008 || Mount Lemmon || Mount Lemmon Survey || — || align=right | 2.1 km || 
|-id=093 bgcolor=#E9E9E9
| 387093 ||  || — || February 14, 2005 || Kitt Peak || Spacewatch || — || align=right | 2.7 km || 
|-id=094 bgcolor=#E9E9E9
| 387094 ||  || — || December 20, 2004 || Mount Lemmon || Mount Lemmon Survey || — || align=right | 1.8 km || 
|-id=095 bgcolor=#E9E9E9
| 387095 ||  || — || December 16, 2004 || Anderson Mesa || LONEOS || RAF || align=right | 1.2 km || 
|-id=096 bgcolor=#E9E9E9
| 387096 ||  || — || September 17, 2003 || Kitt Peak || Spacewatch || — || align=right | 1.5 km || 
|-id=097 bgcolor=#E9E9E9
| 387097 ||  || — || June 15, 2007 || Kitt Peak || Spacewatch || WIT || align=right | 1.3 km || 
|-id=098 bgcolor=#E9E9E9
| 387098 ||  || — || November 15, 2003 || Kitt Peak || Spacewatch || — || align=right | 2.1 km || 
|-id=099 bgcolor=#d6d6d6
| 387099 ||  || — || August 29, 2006 || Kitt Peak || Spacewatch || — || align=right | 3.5 km || 
|-id=100 bgcolor=#fefefe
| 387100 ||  || — || March 15, 2004 || Socorro || LINEAR || NYS || align=right data-sort-value="0.90" | 900 m || 
|}

387101–387200 

|-bgcolor=#E9E9E9
| 387101 ||  || — || April 22, 2007 || Kitt Peak || Spacewatch || — || align=right data-sort-value="0.87" | 870 m || 
|-id=102 bgcolor=#d6d6d6
| 387102 ||  || — || September 12, 2007 || Kitt Peak || Spacewatch || — || align=right | 2.0 km || 
|-id=103 bgcolor=#E9E9E9
| 387103 ||  || — || September 19, 2003 || Kitt Peak || Spacewatch || WIT || align=right | 1.1 km || 
|-id=104 bgcolor=#d6d6d6
| 387104 ||  || — || September 19, 2001 || Socorro || LINEAR || — || align=right | 4.8 km || 
|-id=105 bgcolor=#E9E9E9
| 387105 ||  || — || August 17, 1999 || Kitt Peak || Spacewatch || — || align=right | 1.9 km || 
|-id=106 bgcolor=#fefefe
| 387106 ||  || — || September 7, 2004 || Kitt Peak || Spacewatch || NYS || align=right data-sort-value="0.72" | 720 m || 
|-id=107 bgcolor=#E9E9E9
| 387107 ||  || — || August 23, 2007 || Kitt Peak || Spacewatch || HOF || align=right | 2.9 km || 
|-id=108 bgcolor=#d6d6d6
| 387108 ||  || — || September 28, 2006 || Kitt Peak || Spacewatch || — || align=right | 2.6 km || 
|-id=109 bgcolor=#d6d6d6
| 387109 ||  || — || September 5, 1996 || Kitt Peak || Spacewatch || — || align=right | 2.2 km || 
|-id=110 bgcolor=#E9E9E9
| 387110 ||  || — || September 10, 2007 || Kitt Peak || Spacewatch || — || align=right | 1.8 km || 
|-id=111 bgcolor=#d6d6d6
| 387111 ||  || — || November 23, 2008 || Kitt Peak || Spacewatch || — || align=right | 2.1 km || 
|-id=112 bgcolor=#E9E9E9
| 387112 ||  || — || March 9, 2005 || Mount Lemmon || Mount Lemmon Survey || AGN || align=right | 1.3 km || 
|-id=113 bgcolor=#d6d6d6
| 387113 ||  || — || April 9, 2005 || Mount Lemmon || Mount Lemmon Survey || K-2 || align=right | 1.4 km || 
|-id=114 bgcolor=#E9E9E9
| 387114 ||  || — || November 1, 2008 || Mount Lemmon || Mount Lemmon Survey || — || align=right | 1.4 km || 
|-id=115 bgcolor=#E9E9E9
| 387115 ||  || — || May 4, 2006 || Kitt Peak || Spacewatch || GEF || align=right | 1.4 km || 
|-id=116 bgcolor=#E9E9E9
| 387116 ||  || — || December 19, 2004 || Mount Lemmon || Mount Lemmon Survey || — || align=right | 1.2 km || 
|-id=117 bgcolor=#d6d6d6
| 387117 ||  || — || August 19, 2006 || Kitt Peak || Spacewatch || — || align=right | 3.1 km || 
|-id=118 bgcolor=#d6d6d6
| 387118 ||  || — || November 8, 2008 || Mount Lemmon || Mount Lemmon Survey || — || align=right | 3.0 km || 
|-id=119 bgcolor=#fefefe
| 387119 ||  || — || February 6, 1997 || Kitt Peak || Spacewatch || V || align=right data-sort-value="0.77" | 770 m || 
|-id=120 bgcolor=#d6d6d6
| 387120 ||  || — || September 18, 2006 || Catalina || CSS || — || align=right | 3.1 km || 
|-id=121 bgcolor=#d6d6d6
| 387121 ||  || — || February 3, 2000 || Kitt Peak || Spacewatch || KOR || align=right | 1.5 km || 
|-id=122 bgcolor=#fefefe
| 387122 ||  || — || September 10, 2004 || Socorro || LINEAR || — || align=right | 1.4 km || 
|-id=123 bgcolor=#d6d6d6
| 387123 ||  || — || April 13, 2004 || Kitt Peak || Spacewatch || HYG || align=right | 2.5 km || 
|-id=124 bgcolor=#d6d6d6
| 387124 ||  || — || April 6, 2005 || Kitt Peak || Spacewatch || — || align=right | 3.3 km || 
|-id=125 bgcolor=#E9E9E9
| 387125 ||  || — || October 27, 2003 || Kitt Peak || Spacewatch || — || align=right | 2.2 km || 
|-id=126 bgcolor=#d6d6d6
| 387126 ||  || — || November 8, 2007 || Mount Lemmon || Mount Lemmon Survey || — || align=right | 2.0 km || 
|-id=127 bgcolor=#d6d6d6
| 387127 ||  || — || November 14, 2007 || Kitt Peak || Spacewatch || — || align=right | 2.6 km || 
|-id=128 bgcolor=#d6d6d6
| 387128 ||  || — || December 11, 2001 || Socorro || LINEAR || VER || align=right | 3.5 km || 
|-id=129 bgcolor=#E9E9E9
| 387129 ||  || — || September 27, 2003 || Kitt Peak || Spacewatch || — || align=right | 2.1 km || 
|-id=130 bgcolor=#E9E9E9
| 387130 ||  || — || January 16, 2009 || Mount Lemmon || Mount Lemmon Survey || AGN || align=right | 1.2 km || 
|-id=131 bgcolor=#fefefe
| 387131 ||  || — || July 31, 2008 || Kitt Peak || Spacewatch || — || align=right | 1.1 km || 
|-id=132 bgcolor=#fefefe
| 387132 ||  || — || December 5, 2005 || Kitt Peak || Spacewatch || MAS || align=right data-sort-value="0.99" | 990 m || 
|-id=133 bgcolor=#d6d6d6
| 387133 ||  || — || November 19, 2007 || Kitt Peak || Spacewatch || MRC || align=right | 2.8 km || 
|-id=134 bgcolor=#E9E9E9
| 387134 ||  || — || March 24, 2006 || Mount Lemmon || Mount Lemmon Survey || — || align=right data-sort-value="0.89" | 890 m || 
|-id=135 bgcolor=#fefefe
| 387135 ||  || — || January 8, 2006 || Mount Lemmon || Mount Lemmon Survey || V || align=right | 1.1 km || 
|-id=136 bgcolor=#E9E9E9
| 387136 ||  || — || October 2, 2003 || Kitt Peak || Spacewatch || WIT || align=right data-sort-value="0.98" | 980 m || 
|-id=137 bgcolor=#fefefe
| 387137 ||  || — || April 12, 2004 || Kitt Peak || Spacewatch || — || align=right data-sort-value="0.83" | 830 m || 
|-id=138 bgcolor=#d6d6d6
| 387138 ||  || — || October 9, 2007 || Mount Lemmon || Mount Lemmon Survey || — || align=right | 2.2 km || 
|-id=139 bgcolor=#E9E9E9
| 387139 ||  || — || November 20, 2003 || Kitt Peak || Spacewatch || WIT || align=right | 1.0 km || 
|-id=140 bgcolor=#d6d6d6
| 387140 ||  || — || November 20, 2001 || Socorro || LINEAR || VER || align=right | 3.2 km || 
|-id=141 bgcolor=#E9E9E9
| 387141 ||  || — || October 22, 2003 || Kitt Peak || Spacewatch || — || align=right | 2.5 km || 
|-id=142 bgcolor=#d6d6d6
| 387142 ||  || — || December 29, 2008 || Mount Lemmon || Mount Lemmon Survey || CHA || align=right | 2.5 km || 
|-id=143 bgcolor=#E9E9E9
| 387143 ||  || — || October 1, 2003 || Kitt Peak || Spacewatch || — || align=right | 1.8 km || 
|-id=144 bgcolor=#E9E9E9
| 387144 ||  || — || February 14, 2005 || Catalina || CSS || — || align=right | 1.8 km || 
|-id=145 bgcolor=#fefefe
| 387145 ||  || — || April 29, 2000 || Socorro || LINEAR || — || align=right | 1.1 km || 
|-id=146 bgcolor=#E9E9E9
| 387146 ||  || — || November 10, 2004 || Kitt Peak || Spacewatch || — || align=right | 1.4 km || 
|-id=147 bgcolor=#d6d6d6
| 387147 ||  || — || September 10, 2007 || Kitt Peak || Spacewatch || CHA || align=right | 2.4 km || 
|-id=148 bgcolor=#E9E9E9
| 387148 ||  || — || November 8, 2008 || Mount Lemmon || Mount Lemmon Survey || — || align=right | 1.7 km || 
|-id=149 bgcolor=#E9E9E9
| 387149 ||  || — || November 8, 2008 || Kitt Peak || Spacewatch || — || align=right | 1.4 km || 
|-id=150 bgcolor=#fefefe
| 387150 ||  || — || April 21, 2003 || Kitt Peak || Spacewatch || — || align=right | 1.2 km || 
|-id=151 bgcolor=#E9E9E9
| 387151 ||  || — || October 16, 2003 || Anderson Mesa || LONEOS || — || align=right | 2.8 km || 
|-id=152 bgcolor=#E9E9E9
| 387152 ||  || — || November 2, 2008 || Mount Lemmon || Mount Lemmon Survey || — || align=right | 2.1 km || 
|-id=153 bgcolor=#E9E9E9
| 387153 ||  || — || January 23, 2006 || Kitt Peak || Spacewatch || — || align=right data-sort-value="0.88" | 880 m || 
|-id=154 bgcolor=#E9E9E9
| 387154 ||  || — || December 18, 2004 || Mount Lemmon || Mount Lemmon Survey || — || align=right | 1.6 km || 
|-id=155 bgcolor=#E9E9E9
| 387155 ||  || — || January 16, 2005 || Kitt Peak || Spacewatch || — || align=right | 2.3 km || 
|-id=156 bgcolor=#fefefe
| 387156 ||  || — || December 1, 2005 || Kitt Peak || Spacewatch || NYS || align=right data-sort-value="0.68" | 680 m || 
|-id=157 bgcolor=#E9E9E9
| 387157 ||  || — || October 20, 2003 || Kitt Peak || Spacewatch || — || align=right | 2.2 km || 
|-id=158 bgcolor=#E9E9E9
| 387158 ||  || — || February 4, 2005 || Kitt Peak || Spacewatch || AST || align=right | 2.4 km || 
|-id=159 bgcolor=#E9E9E9
| 387159 ||  || — || September 21, 2008 || Kitt Peak || Spacewatch || — || align=right data-sort-value="0.90" | 900 m || 
|-id=160 bgcolor=#E9E9E9
| 387160 ||  || — || March 8, 2005 || Mount Lemmon || Mount Lemmon Survey || — || align=right | 1.9 km || 
|-id=161 bgcolor=#d6d6d6
| 387161 ||  || — || November 20, 2001 || Socorro || LINEAR || HYG || align=right | 2.5 km || 
|-id=162 bgcolor=#fefefe
| 387162 ||  || — || February 25, 2007 || Mount Lemmon || Mount Lemmon Survey || V || align=right data-sort-value="0.80" | 800 m || 
|-id=163 bgcolor=#E9E9E9
| 387163 ||  || — || September 14, 2012 || Catalina || CSS || HOF || align=right | 3.1 km || 
|-id=164 bgcolor=#d6d6d6
| 387164 ||  || — || March 27, 2004 || Kitt Peak || Spacewatch || — || align=right | 3.2 km || 
|-id=165 bgcolor=#d6d6d6
| 387165 ||  || — || September 15, 2006 || Kitt Peak || Spacewatch || EOS || align=right | 2.1 km || 
|-id=166 bgcolor=#E9E9E9
| 387166 ||  || — || January 27, 2000 || Kitt Peak || Spacewatch || DOR || align=right | 3.5 km || 
|-id=167 bgcolor=#d6d6d6
| 387167 ||  || — || November 19, 2007 || Kitt Peak || Spacewatch || LIX || align=right | 4.1 km || 
|-id=168 bgcolor=#d6d6d6
| 387168 ||  || — || February 3, 2009 || Mount Lemmon || Mount Lemmon Survey || EOS || align=right | 2.0 km || 
|-id=169 bgcolor=#E9E9E9
| 387169 ||  || — || October 22, 2008 || Kitt Peak || Spacewatch || — || align=right | 2.3 km || 
|-id=170 bgcolor=#fefefe
| 387170 ||  || — || October 30, 2005 || Mount Lemmon || Mount Lemmon Survey || — || align=right data-sort-value="0.75" | 750 m || 
|-id=171 bgcolor=#fefefe
| 387171 ||  || — || May 12, 2004 || Anderson Mesa || LONEOS || — || align=right data-sort-value="0.86" | 860 m || 
|-id=172 bgcolor=#d6d6d6
| 387172 ||  || — || February 15, 2010 || WISE || WISE || — || align=right | 2.9 km || 
|-id=173 bgcolor=#d6d6d6
| 387173 ||  || — || January 30, 2009 || Kitt Peak || Spacewatch || EOS || align=right | 3.2 km || 
|-id=174 bgcolor=#d6d6d6
| 387174 ||  || — || December 20, 2007 || Kitt Peak || Spacewatch || — || align=right | 3.1 km || 
|-id=175 bgcolor=#E9E9E9
| 387175 ||  || — || February 8, 2010 || Kitt Peak || Spacewatch || — || align=right | 2.3 km || 
|-id=176 bgcolor=#E9E9E9
| 387176 ||  || — || December 30, 2000 || Kitt Peak || Spacewatch || — || align=right | 1.8 km || 
|-id=177 bgcolor=#d6d6d6
| 387177 ||  || — || December 21, 2008 || Mount Lemmon || Mount Lemmon Survey || — || align=right | 1.9 km || 
|-id=178 bgcolor=#d6d6d6
| 387178 ||  || — || October 15, 2007 || Kitt Peak || Spacewatch || — || align=right | 2.4 km || 
|-id=179 bgcolor=#E9E9E9
| 387179 ||  || — || March 9, 2005 || Mount Lemmon || Mount Lemmon Survey || MRX || align=right | 1.1 km || 
|-id=180 bgcolor=#d6d6d6
| 387180 ||  || — || September 13, 2007 || Mount Lemmon || Mount Lemmon Survey || KOR || align=right | 1.3 km || 
|-id=181 bgcolor=#E9E9E9
| 387181 ||  || — || September 27, 2003 || Kitt Peak || Spacewatch || — || align=right | 1.3 km || 
|-id=182 bgcolor=#fefefe
| 387182 ||  || — || March 13, 2007 || Kitt Peak || Spacewatch || — || align=right data-sort-value="0.97" | 970 m || 
|-id=183 bgcolor=#E9E9E9
| 387183 ||  || — || March 3, 2005 || Kitt Peak || Spacewatch || — || align=right | 2.5 km || 
|-id=184 bgcolor=#d6d6d6
| 387184 ||  || — || February 19, 2009 || Kitt Peak || Spacewatch || — || align=right | 3.0 km || 
|-id=185 bgcolor=#d6d6d6
| 387185 ||  || — || August 28, 2006 || Kitt Peak || Spacewatch || — || align=right | 2.8 km || 
|-id=186 bgcolor=#E9E9E9
| 387186 ||  || — || September 10, 2007 || Kitt Peak || Spacewatch || AGN || align=right | 1.0 km || 
|-id=187 bgcolor=#d6d6d6
| 387187 ||  || — || September 14, 2007 || Kitt Peak || Spacewatch || KOR || align=right | 1.6 km || 
|-id=188 bgcolor=#d6d6d6
| 387188 ||  || — || November 19, 2007 || Mount Lemmon || Mount Lemmon Survey || — || align=right | 2.8 km || 
|-id=189 bgcolor=#d6d6d6
| 387189 ||  || — || March 1, 2009 || Kitt Peak || Spacewatch || — || align=right | 2.9 km || 
|-id=190 bgcolor=#fefefe
| 387190 ||  || — || May 31, 1997 || Kitt Peak || Spacewatch || — || align=right data-sort-value="0.84" | 840 m || 
|-id=191 bgcolor=#d6d6d6
| 387191 ||  || — || September 26, 1995 || Kitt Peak || Spacewatch || THM || align=right | 2.1 km || 
|-id=192 bgcolor=#E9E9E9
| 387192 ||  || — || December 1, 2003 || Kitt Peak || Spacewatch || AGN || align=right | 1.3 km || 
|-id=193 bgcolor=#E9E9E9
| 387193 ||  || — || September 12, 2007 || Anderson Mesa || LONEOS || HOF || align=right | 3.3 km || 
|-id=194 bgcolor=#d6d6d6
| 387194 ||  || — || November 17, 2001 || Socorro || LINEAR || URS || align=right | 3.9 km || 
|-id=195 bgcolor=#E9E9E9
| 387195 ||  || — || November 7, 2008 || Mount Lemmon || Mount Lemmon Survey || — || align=right | 2.5 km || 
|-id=196 bgcolor=#d6d6d6
| 387196 ||  || — || December 19, 2007 || Mount Lemmon || Mount Lemmon Survey || — || align=right | 2.7 km || 
|-id=197 bgcolor=#d6d6d6
| 387197 ||  || — || November 17, 1995 || Kitt Peak || Spacewatch || URS || align=right | 3.8 km || 
|-id=198 bgcolor=#d6d6d6
| 387198 ||  || — || December 14, 2001 || Socorro || LINEAR || THM || align=right | 2.6 km || 
|-id=199 bgcolor=#d6d6d6
| 387199 ||  || — || February 3, 2009 || Mount Lemmon || Mount Lemmon Survey || TEL || align=right | 1.7 km || 
|-id=200 bgcolor=#E9E9E9
| 387200 ||  || — || November 8, 2008 || Mount Lemmon || Mount Lemmon Survey || — || align=right | 2.1 km || 
|}

387201–387300 

|-bgcolor=#d6d6d6
| 387201 ||  || — || October 14, 2001 || Kitt Peak || Spacewatch || — || align=right | 3.7 km || 
|-id=202 bgcolor=#d6d6d6
| 387202 ||  || — || August 19, 2006 || Kitt Peak || Spacewatch || EMA || align=right | 3.2 km || 
|-id=203 bgcolor=#E9E9E9
| 387203 ||  || — || March 3, 2005 || Catalina || CSS || — || align=right | 2.7 km || 
|-id=204 bgcolor=#fefefe
| 387204 ||  || — || October 10, 2005 || Anderson Mesa || LONEOS || V || align=right data-sort-value="0.79" | 790 m || 
|-id=205 bgcolor=#E9E9E9
| 387205 ||  || — || April 25, 2007 || Mount Lemmon || Mount Lemmon Survey || — || align=right | 1.2 km || 
|-id=206 bgcolor=#d6d6d6
| 387206 ||  || — || October 19, 2007 || Socorro || LINEAR || — || align=right | 3.3 km || 
|-id=207 bgcolor=#E9E9E9
| 387207 ||  || — || March 29, 2001 || Kitt Peak || Spacewatch || HEN || align=right | 1.4 km || 
|-id=208 bgcolor=#E9E9E9
| 387208 ||  || — || October 1, 2003 || Anderson Mesa || LONEOS || — || align=right | 3.4 km || 
|-id=209 bgcolor=#E9E9E9
| 387209 ||  || — || October 4, 2007 || Catalina || CSS || — || align=right | 2.9 km || 
|-id=210 bgcolor=#d6d6d6
| 387210 ||  || — || September 19, 1995 || Kitt Peak || Spacewatch || URS || align=right | 4.0 km || 
|-id=211 bgcolor=#d6d6d6
| 387211 ||  || — || August 21, 2006 || Kitt Peak || Spacewatch || — || align=right | 3.4 km || 
|-id=212 bgcolor=#d6d6d6
| 387212 ||  || — || September 19, 2006 || Anderson Mesa || LONEOS || — || align=right | 3.6 km || 
|-id=213 bgcolor=#d6d6d6
| 387213 ||  || — || September 14, 2006 || Catalina || CSS || — || align=right | 3.4 km || 
|-id=214 bgcolor=#d6d6d6
| 387214 ||  || — || February 3, 1997 || Kitt Peak || Spacewatch || — || align=right | 3.3 km || 
|-id=215 bgcolor=#fefefe
| 387215 ||  || — || October 9, 2008 || Mount Lemmon || Mount Lemmon Survey || MAS || align=right data-sort-value="0.82" | 820 m || 
|-id=216 bgcolor=#fefefe
| 387216 ||  || — || March 10, 2007 || Kitt Peak || Spacewatch || V || align=right data-sort-value="0.65" | 650 m || 
|-id=217 bgcolor=#E9E9E9
| 387217 ||  || — || June 26, 2010 || WISE || WISE || HOF || align=right | 2.7 km || 
|-id=218 bgcolor=#E9E9E9
| 387218 ||  || — || November 30, 2003 || Kitt Peak || Spacewatch || — || align=right | 2.4 km || 
|-id=219 bgcolor=#d6d6d6
| 387219 ||  || — || October 9, 2007 || Kitt Peak || Spacewatch || — || align=right | 2.2 km || 
|-id=220 bgcolor=#fefefe
| 387220 ||  || — || October 24, 2005 || Kitt Peak || Spacewatch || MAS || align=right data-sort-value="0.83" | 830 m || 
|-id=221 bgcolor=#E9E9E9
| 387221 ||  || — || October 21, 2003 || Kitt Peak || Spacewatch || PAD || align=right | 1.7 km || 
|-id=222 bgcolor=#E9E9E9
| 387222 ||  || — || September 3, 2007 || Catalina || CSS || — || align=right | 2.6 km || 
|-id=223 bgcolor=#E9E9E9
| 387223 ||  || — || March 14, 2010 || Kitt Peak || Spacewatch || — || align=right | 2.4 km || 
|-id=224 bgcolor=#E9E9E9
| 387224 ||  || — || November 15, 2003 || Kitt Peak || Spacewatch || — || align=right | 2.4 km || 
|-id=225 bgcolor=#E9E9E9
| 387225 ||  || — || November 22, 2008 || Socorro || LINEAR || — || align=right | 1.9 km || 
|-id=226 bgcolor=#d6d6d6
| 387226 ||  || — || September 15, 2007 || Mount Lemmon || Mount Lemmon Survey || — || align=right | 3.6 km || 
|-id=227 bgcolor=#E9E9E9
| 387227 ||  || — || June 14, 2007 || Kitt Peak || Spacewatch || — || align=right | 1.3 km || 
|-id=228 bgcolor=#d6d6d6
| 387228 ||  || — || February 5, 2009 || Kitt Peak || Spacewatch || — || align=right | 2.5 km || 
|-id=229 bgcolor=#E9E9E9
| 387229 ||  || — || March 9, 2005 || Mount Lemmon || Mount Lemmon Survey || — || align=right | 2.0 km || 
|-id=230 bgcolor=#fefefe
| 387230 ||  || — || May 8, 2011 || Catalina || CSS || — || align=right | 1.0 km || 
|-id=231 bgcolor=#E9E9E9
| 387231 ||  || — || January 15, 2005 || Kitt Peak || Spacewatch || — || align=right | 1.7 km || 
|-id=232 bgcolor=#E9E9E9
| 387232 ||  || — || November 19, 2003 || Kitt Peak || Spacewatch || — || align=right | 1.9 km || 
|-id=233 bgcolor=#fefefe
| 387233 ||  || — || October 14, 2001 || Kitt Peak || Spacewatch || — || align=right data-sort-value="0.90" | 900 m || 
|-id=234 bgcolor=#E9E9E9
| 387234 ||  || — || May 6, 2006 || Mount Lemmon || Mount Lemmon Survey || — || align=right | 2.1 km || 
|-id=235 bgcolor=#E9E9E9
| 387235 ||  || — || September 18, 2003 || Kitt Peak || Spacewatch || PAD || align=right | 1.6 km || 
|-id=236 bgcolor=#E9E9E9
| 387236 ||  || — || January 31, 2006 || Kitt Peak || Spacewatch || — || align=right | 1.1 km || 
|-id=237 bgcolor=#E9E9E9
| 387237 ||  || — || February 9, 2005 || Mount Lemmon || Mount Lemmon Survey || — || align=right | 2.1 km || 
|-id=238 bgcolor=#E9E9E9
| 387238 ||  || — || April 12, 2010 || Mount Lemmon || Mount Lemmon Survey || PAD || align=right | 2.0 km || 
|-id=239 bgcolor=#E9E9E9
| 387239 ||  || — || November 24, 2008 || Kitt Peak || Spacewatch || HOF || align=right | 2.8 km || 
|-id=240 bgcolor=#d6d6d6
| 387240 ||  || — || March 3, 2009 || Kitt Peak || Spacewatch || HYG || align=right | 2.5 km || 
|-id=241 bgcolor=#E9E9E9
| 387241 ||  || — || September 16, 2003 || Kitt Peak || Spacewatch || — || align=right | 1.7 km || 
|-id=242 bgcolor=#d6d6d6
| 387242 ||  || — || September 15, 2007 || Mount Lemmon || Mount Lemmon Survey || EOS || align=right | 1.9 km || 
|-id=243 bgcolor=#d6d6d6
| 387243 ||  || — || August 28, 2006 || Kitt Peak || Spacewatch || — || align=right | 2.6 km || 
|-id=244 bgcolor=#d6d6d6
| 387244 ||  || — || December 3, 2007 || Kitt Peak || Spacewatch || EOS || align=right | 2.4 km || 
|-id=245 bgcolor=#E9E9E9
| 387245 ||  || — || October 26, 2008 || Mount Lemmon || Mount Lemmon Survey || — || align=right | 1.6 km || 
|-id=246 bgcolor=#d6d6d6
| 387246 ||  || — || October 21, 1995 || Kitt Peak || Spacewatch || — || align=right | 3.0 km || 
|-id=247 bgcolor=#E9E9E9
| 387247 ||  || — || September 10, 2007 || Catalina || CSS || HOF || align=right | 3.0 km || 
|-id=248 bgcolor=#E9E9E9
| 387248 ||  || — || September 13, 2007 || Mount Lemmon || Mount Lemmon Survey || WIT || align=right | 1.0 km || 
|-id=249 bgcolor=#fefefe
| 387249 ||  || — || October 22, 2005 || Kitt Peak || Spacewatch || V || align=right data-sort-value="0.66" | 660 m || 
|-id=250 bgcolor=#E9E9E9
| 387250 ||  || — || May 2, 1997 || Kitt Peak || Spacewatch || PAD || align=right | 5.7 km || 
|-id=251 bgcolor=#d6d6d6
| 387251 ||  || — || November 8, 2007 || Kitt Peak || Spacewatch || EOS || align=right | 2.5 km || 
|-id=252 bgcolor=#E9E9E9
| 387252 ||  || — || October 14, 1998 || Caussols || ODAS || WIT || align=right | 1.3 km || 
|-id=253 bgcolor=#d6d6d6
| 387253 ||  || — || September 17, 2006 || Kitt Peak || Spacewatch || HYG || align=right | 2.9 km || 
|-id=254 bgcolor=#d6d6d6
| 387254 ||  || — || September 23, 2001 || Kitt Peak || Spacewatch || — || align=right | 2.7 km || 
|-id=255 bgcolor=#E9E9E9
| 387255 ||  || — || September 17, 2003 || Kitt Peak || Spacewatch || — || align=right | 2.0 km || 
|-id=256 bgcolor=#E9E9E9
| 387256 ||  || — || December 12, 2004 || Kitt Peak || Spacewatch || — || align=right | 1.8 km || 
|-id=257 bgcolor=#d6d6d6
| 387257 ||  || — || October 24, 1995 || Kitt Peak || Spacewatch || — || align=right | 2.6 km || 
|-id=258 bgcolor=#fefefe
| 387258 ||  || — || September 9, 2008 || Mount Lemmon || Mount Lemmon Survey || V || align=right data-sort-value="0.83" | 830 m || 
|-id=259 bgcolor=#E9E9E9
| 387259 ||  || — || October 24, 2003 || Kitt Peak || Spacewatch || — || align=right | 2.0 km || 
|-id=260 bgcolor=#E9E9E9
| 387260 ||  || — || September 15, 2007 || Kitt Peak || Spacewatch || — || align=right | 2.1 km || 
|-id=261 bgcolor=#E9E9E9
| 387261 ||  || — || March 18, 2010 || Mount Lemmon || Mount Lemmon Survey || — || align=right | 1.4 km || 
|-id=262 bgcolor=#E9E9E9
| 387262 ||  || — || April 27, 2001 || Kitt Peak || Spacewatch || GEF || align=right | 1.4 km || 
|-id=263 bgcolor=#E9E9E9
| 387263 ||  || — || March 17, 2005 || Mount Lemmon || Mount Lemmon Survey || HOF || align=right | 2.4 km || 
|-id=264 bgcolor=#E9E9E9
| 387264 ||  || — || October 15, 1995 || Kitt Peak || Spacewatch || — || align=right | 1.5 km || 
|-id=265 bgcolor=#d6d6d6
| 387265 ||  || — || April 12, 2004 || Kitt Peak || Spacewatch || — || align=right | 3.4 km || 
|-id=266 bgcolor=#d6d6d6
| 387266 ||  || — || March 1, 2009 || Kitt Peak || Spacewatch || EOS || align=right | 1.9 km || 
|-id=267 bgcolor=#E9E9E9
| 387267 ||  || — || October 8, 2012 || Mount Lemmon || Mount Lemmon Survey || — || align=right | 1.9 km || 
|-id=268 bgcolor=#E9E9E9
| 387268 ||  || — || September 29, 2008 || Mount Lemmon || Mount Lemmon Survey || RAF || align=right | 1.2 km || 
|-id=269 bgcolor=#fefefe
| 387269 ||  || — || April 30, 2004 || Kitt Peak || Spacewatch || — || align=right data-sort-value="0.97" | 970 m || 
|-id=270 bgcolor=#d6d6d6
| 387270 ||  || — || December 19, 2003 || Kitt Peak || Spacewatch || KOR || align=right | 1.7 km || 
|-id=271 bgcolor=#E9E9E9
| 387271 ||  || — || November 19, 2003 || Kitt Peak || Spacewatch || AGN || align=right | 1.0 km || 
|-id=272 bgcolor=#fefefe
| 387272 ||  || — || February 13, 2007 || Mount Lemmon || Mount Lemmon Survey || — || align=right data-sort-value="0.95" | 950 m || 
|-id=273 bgcolor=#E9E9E9
| 387273 ||  || — || August 10, 2007 || Kitt Peak || Spacewatch || — || align=right | 2.4 km || 
|-id=274 bgcolor=#d6d6d6
| 387274 ||  || — || September 15, 2006 || Kitt Peak || Spacewatch || — || align=right | 3.6 km || 
|-id=275 bgcolor=#d6d6d6
| 387275 ||  || — || July 5, 2005 || Mount Lemmon || Mount Lemmon Survey || CRO || align=right | 3.6 km || 
|-id=276 bgcolor=#d6d6d6
| 387276 ||  || — || October 4, 2004 || Kitt Peak || Spacewatch || 3:2 || align=right | 4.2 km || 
|-id=277 bgcolor=#E9E9E9
| 387277 ||  || — || October 21, 2003 || Kitt Peak || Spacewatch || MAR || align=right | 1.4 km || 
|-id=278 bgcolor=#d6d6d6
| 387278 ||  || — || November 18, 1995 || Kitt Peak || Spacewatch || — || align=right | 2.7 km || 
|-id=279 bgcolor=#d6d6d6
| 387279 ||  || — || September 14, 2006 || Catalina || CSS || — || align=right | 3.1 km || 
|-id=280 bgcolor=#E9E9E9
| 387280 ||  || — || January 23, 2006 || Kitt Peak || Spacewatch || — || align=right | 1.4 km || 
|-id=281 bgcolor=#d6d6d6
| 387281 ||  || — || January 30, 2009 || Mount Lemmon || Mount Lemmon Survey || — || align=right | 2.7 km || 
|-id=282 bgcolor=#E9E9E9
| 387282 ||  || — || February 2, 2006 || Mount Lemmon || Mount Lemmon Survey || — || align=right | 1.1 km || 
|-id=283 bgcolor=#d6d6d6
| 387283 ||  || — || September 26, 2006 || Kitt Peak || Spacewatch || — || align=right | 2.8 km || 
|-id=284 bgcolor=#E9E9E9
| 387284 ||  || — || January 4, 2000 || Kitt Peak || Spacewatch || HEN || align=right | 1.4 km || 
|-id=285 bgcolor=#d6d6d6
| 387285 ||  || — || December 3, 2007 || Kitt Peak || Spacewatch || — || align=right | 2.8 km || 
|-id=286 bgcolor=#d6d6d6
| 387286 ||  || — || November 14, 2007 || Mount Lemmon || Mount Lemmon Survey || — || align=right | 3.1 km || 
|-id=287 bgcolor=#E9E9E9
| 387287 ||  || — || October 25, 2003 || Kitt Peak || Spacewatch || — || align=right | 2.3 km || 
|-id=288 bgcolor=#E9E9E9
| 387288 ||  || — || March 4, 2005 || Mount Lemmon || Mount Lemmon Survey || HOF || align=right | 2.9 km || 
|-id=289 bgcolor=#E9E9E9
| 387289 ||  || — || November 8, 1996 || Kitt Peak || Spacewatch || — || align=right | 1.3 km || 
|-id=290 bgcolor=#fefefe
| 387290 ||  || — || November 6, 2005 || Socorro || LINEAR || V || align=right data-sort-value="0.82" | 820 m || 
|-id=291 bgcolor=#E9E9E9
| 387291 ||  || — || February 17, 2010 || Catalina || CSS || — || align=right | 1.5 km || 
|-id=292 bgcolor=#E9E9E9
| 387292 ||  || — || September 29, 2003 || Anderson Mesa || LONEOS || — || align=right | 1.9 km || 
|-id=293 bgcolor=#fefefe
| 387293 ||  || — || September 15, 2004 || Kitt Peak || Spacewatch || — || align=right data-sort-value="0.95" | 950 m || 
|-id=294 bgcolor=#d6d6d6
| 387294 ||  || — || November 3, 2007 || Mount Lemmon || Mount Lemmon Survey || — || align=right | 3.4 km || 
|-id=295 bgcolor=#fefefe
| 387295 ||  || — || March 16, 2007 || Mount Lemmon || Mount Lemmon Survey || V || align=right data-sort-value="0.74" | 740 m || 
|-id=296 bgcolor=#d6d6d6
| 387296 ||  || — || April 11, 2010 || Mount Lemmon || Mount Lemmon Survey || EOS || align=right | 2.2 km || 
|-id=297 bgcolor=#E9E9E9
| 387297 ||  || — || September 4, 2007 || Catalina || CSS || — || align=right | 2.3 km || 
|-id=298 bgcolor=#E9E9E9
| 387298 ||  || — || October 27, 2008 || Mount Lemmon || Mount Lemmon Survey || — || align=right | 1.9 km || 
|-id=299 bgcolor=#E9E9E9
| 387299 ||  || — || March 11, 2005 || Mount Lemmon || Mount Lemmon Survey || AGN || align=right | 1.3 km || 
|-id=300 bgcolor=#E9E9E9
| 387300 ||  || — || September 13, 2007 || Mount Lemmon || Mount Lemmon Survey || AGN || align=right | 1.2 km || 
|}

387301–387400 

|-bgcolor=#d6d6d6
| 387301 ||  || — || December 18, 2001 || Socorro || LINEAR || — || align=right | 3.9 km || 
|-id=302 bgcolor=#d6d6d6
| 387302 ||  || — || March 23, 2004 || Socorro || LINEAR || — || align=right | 3.3 km || 
|-id=303 bgcolor=#E9E9E9
| 387303 ||  || — || October 17, 2003 || Kitt Peak || Spacewatch || NEM || align=right | 2.0 km || 
|-id=304 bgcolor=#E9E9E9
| 387304 ||  || — || March 20, 2010 || Mount Lemmon || Mount Lemmon Survey || — || align=right | 1.8 km || 
|-id=305 bgcolor=#d6d6d6
| 387305 ||  || — || August 28, 2006 || Kitt Peak || Spacewatch || THM || align=right | 2.7 km || 
|-id=306 bgcolor=#d6d6d6
| 387306 ||  || — || August 29, 2006 || Kitt Peak || Spacewatch || — || align=right | 2.6 km || 
|-id=307 bgcolor=#d6d6d6
| 387307 ||  || — || September 15, 2007 || Mount Lemmon || Mount Lemmon Survey || EOS || align=right | 2.5 km || 
|-id=308 bgcolor=#E9E9E9
| 387308 ||  || — || January 12, 1996 || Kitt Peak || Spacewatch || XIZ || align=right | 1.3 km || 
|-id=309 bgcolor=#d6d6d6
| 387309 ||  || — || May 7, 2005 || Mount Lemmon || Mount Lemmon Survey || EOS || align=right | 1.8 km || 
|-id=310 bgcolor=#E9E9E9
| 387310 ||  || — || February 2, 2005 || Kitt Peak || Spacewatch || HEN || align=right | 1.1 km || 
|-id=311 bgcolor=#E9E9E9
| 387311 ||  || — || March 11, 1996 || Kitt Peak || Spacewatch || — || align=right | 2.2 km || 
|-id=312 bgcolor=#d6d6d6
| 387312 ||  || — || October 16, 2006 || Catalina || CSS || — || align=right | 4.2 km || 
|-id=313 bgcolor=#E9E9E9
| 387313 ||  || — || November 21, 2003 || Socorro || LINEAR || WIT || align=right | 1.5 km || 
|-id=314 bgcolor=#d6d6d6
| 387314 ||  || — || April 2, 2005 || Kitt Peak || Spacewatch || — || align=right | 2.6 km || 
|-id=315 bgcolor=#E9E9E9
| 387315 ||  || — || May 12, 2011 || Mount Lemmon || Mount Lemmon Survey || MIS || align=right | 2.8 km || 
|-id=316 bgcolor=#E9E9E9
| 387316 ||  || — || April 7, 2010 || Kitt Peak || Spacewatch || — || align=right | 1.2 km || 
|-id=317 bgcolor=#E9E9E9
| 387317 ||  || — || September 15, 1998 || Kitt Peak || Spacewatch || — || align=right | 1.6 km || 
|-id=318 bgcolor=#E9E9E9
| 387318 ||  || — || October 13, 2007 || Mount Lemmon || Mount Lemmon Survey || NEM || align=right | 2.7 km || 
|-id=319 bgcolor=#d6d6d6
| 387319 ||  || — || November 11, 2007 || Mount Lemmon || Mount Lemmon Survey || THM || align=right | 2.2 km || 
|-id=320 bgcolor=#d6d6d6
| 387320 ||  || — || February 22, 2009 || Kitt Peak || Spacewatch || — || align=right | 3.2 km || 
|-id=321 bgcolor=#d6d6d6
| 387321 ||  || — || March 1, 2009 || Kitt Peak || Spacewatch || — || align=right | 2.9 km || 
|-id=322 bgcolor=#E9E9E9
| 387322 ||  || — || October 15, 2007 || Mount Lemmon || Mount Lemmon Survey || MRX || align=right | 1.3 km || 
|-id=323 bgcolor=#d6d6d6
| 387323 ||  || — || April 6, 2005 || Mount Lemmon || Mount Lemmon Survey || KOR || align=right | 1.7 km || 
|-id=324 bgcolor=#d6d6d6
| 387324 ||  || — || December 4, 2007 || Kitt Peak || Spacewatch || — || align=right | 3.7 km || 
|-id=325 bgcolor=#E9E9E9
| 387325 ||  || — || October 15, 2007 || Catalina || CSS || — || align=right | 4.1 km || 
|-id=326 bgcolor=#fefefe
| 387326 ||  || — || October 27, 2005 || Mount Lemmon || Mount Lemmon Survey || NYS || align=right data-sort-value="0.73" | 730 m || 
|-id=327 bgcolor=#E9E9E9
| 387327 ||  || — || February 9, 2002 || Kitt Peak || Spacewatch || — || align=right | 2.6 km || 
|-id=328 bgcolor=#d6d6d6
| 387328 ||  || — || October 4, 2006 || Mount Lemmon || Mount Lemmon Survey || — || align=right | 3.2 km || 
|-id=329 bgcolor=#d6d6d6
| 387329 ||  || — || October 21, 2001 || Socorro || LINEAR || EOS || align=right | 2.3 km || 
|-id=330 bgcolor=#d6d6d6
| 387330 ||  || — || November 6, 2007 || Kitt Peak || Spacewatch || — || align=right | 3.5 km || 
|-id=331 bgcolor=#d6d6d6
| 387331 ||  || — || September 27, 2006 || Kitt Peak || Spacewatch || — || align=right | 2.6 km || 
|-id=332 bgcolor=#d6d6d6
| 387332 ||  || — || December 5, 2007 || Kitt Peak || Spacewatch || — || align=right | 3.8 km || 
|-id=333 bgcolor=#E9E9E9
| 387333 ||  || — || October 12, 1998 || Kitt Peak || Spacewatch || AST || align=right | 1.8 km || 
|-id=334 bgcolor=#fefefe
| 387334 ||  || — || December 10, 2005 || Kitt Peak || Spacewatch || NYS || align=right data-sort-value="0.90" | 900 m || 
|-id=335 bgcolor=#E9E9E9
| 387335 ||  || — || November 23, 2008 || Kitt Peak || Spacewatch || — || align=right | 2.7 km || 
|-id=336 bgcolor=#d6d6d6
| 387336 ||  || — || November 17, 2007 || Kitt Peak || Spacewatch || — || align=right | 3.4 km || 
|-id=337 bgcolor=#d6d6d6
| 387337 ||  || — || October 21, 2006 || Mount Lemmon || Mount Lemmon Survey || — || align=right | 3.7 km || 
|-id=338 bgcolor=#E9E9E9
| 387338 ||  || — || November 8, 2008 || Mount Lemmon || Mount Lemmon Survey || MAR || align=right | 1.5 km || 
|-id=339 bgcolor=#d6d6d6
| 387339 ||  || — || September 15, 2006 || Kitt Peak || Spacewatch || HYG || align=right | 3.0 km || 
|-id=340 bgcolor=#fefefe
| 387340 ||  || — || October 24, 2008 || Mount Lemmon || Mount Lemmon Survey || V || align=right data-sort-value="0.87" | 870 m || 
|-id=341 bgcolor=#d6d6d6
| 387341 ||  || — || November 17, 2004 || Campo Imperatore || CINEOS || SHU3:2 || align=right | 4.8 km || 
|-id=342 bgcolor=#d6d6d6
| 387342 ||  || — || July 10, 2005 || Kitt Peak || Spacewatch || — || align=right | 3.6 km || 
|-id=343 bgcolor=#d6d6d6
| 387343 ||  || — || April 19, 2004 || Kitt Peak || Spacewatch || — || align=right | 3.2 km || 
|-id=344 bgcolor=#d6d6d6
| 387344 ||  || — || March 26, 1995 || Kitt Peak || Spacewatch || — || align=right | 2.4 km || 
|-id=345 bgcolor=#E9E9E9
| 387345 ||  || — || February 2, 2005 || Kitt Peak || Spacewatch || HEN || align=right | 1.1 km || 
|-id=346 bgcolor=#d6d6d6
| 387346 ||  || — || February 24, 2009 || Mount Lemmon || Mount Lemmon Survey || — || align=right | 3.1 km || 
|-id=347 bgcolor=#fefefe
| 387347 ||  || — || May 26, 2007 || Mount Lemmon || Mount Lemmon Survey || NYS || align=right data-sort-value="0.79" | 790 m || 
|-id=348 bgcolor=#E9E9E9
| 387348 ||  || — || March 13, 2005 || Kitt Peak || Spacewatch || HEN || align=right | 1.3 km || 
|-id=349 bgcolor=#d6d6d6
| 387349 ||  || — || June 11, 2004 || Kitt Peak || Spacewatch || VER || align=right | 3.1 km || 
|-id=350 bgcolor=#d6d6d6
| 387350 ||  || — || August 21, 2006 || Kitt Peak || Spacewatch || — || align=right | 2.8 km || 
|-id=351 bgcolor=#d6d6d6
| 387351 ||  || — || November 4, 2004 || Anderson Mesa || LONEOS || HIL3:2 || align=right | 6.2 km || 
|-id=352 bgcolor=#E9E9E9
| 387352 ||  || — || January 16, 2009 || Mount Lemmon || Mount Lemmon Survey || MRX || align=right | 1.4 km || 
|-id=353 bgcolor=#d6d6d6
| 387353 ||  || — || November 20, 2006 || Kitt Peak || Spacewatch || 7:4 || align=right | 3.1 km || 
|-id=354 bgcolor=#d6d6d6
| 387354 ||  || — || October 20, 2006 || Kitt Peak || Spacewatch || EOS || align=right | 1.9 km || 
|-id=355 bgcolor=#d6d6d6
| 387355 ||  || — || October 21, 2001 || Kitt Peak || Spacewatch || — || align=right | 2.9 km || 
|-id=356 bgcolor=#E9E9E9
| 387356 ||  || — || October 29, 2003 || Kitt Peak || Spacewatch || — || align=right | 2.4 km || 
|-id=357 bgcolor=#d6d6d6
| 387357 ||  || — || December 4, 2007 || Mount Lemmon || Mount Lemmon Survey || — || align=right | 2.6 km || 
|-id=358 bgcolor=#d6d6d6
| 387358 ||  || — || December 14, 2001 || Socorro || LINEAR || — || align=right | 3.7 km || 
|-id=359 bgcolor=#d6d6d6
| 387359 ||  || — || March 19, 2009 || Kitt Peak || Spacewatch || HYG || align=right | 3.0 km || 
|-id=360 bgcolor=#d6d6d6
| 387360 ||  || — || August 27, 2006 || Kitt Peak || Spacewatch || — || align=right | 2.2 km || 
|-id=361 bgcolor=#d6d6d6
| 387361 ||  || — || August 29, 2006 || Catalina || CSS || — || align=right | 3.2 km || 
|-id=362 bgcolor=#E9E9E9
| 387362 ||  || — || January 20, 2009 || Mount Lemmon || Mount Lemmon Survey || — || align=right | 2.5 km || 
|-id=363 bgcolor=#d6d6d6
| 387363 ||  || — || October 20, 2007 || Mount Lemmon || Mount Lemmon Survey || — || align=right | 2.5 km || 
|-id=364 bgcolor=#d6d6d6
| 387364 ||  || — || November 2, 2007 || Mount Lemmon || Mount Lemmon Survey || CHA || align=right | 2.2 km || 
|-id=365 bgcolor=#d6d6d6
| 387365 ||  || — || September 25, 2006 || Catalina || CSS || — || align=right | 4.4 km || 
|-id=366 bgcolor=#fefefe
| 387366 ||  || — || February 1, 2006 || Kitt Peak || Spacewatch || — || align=right | 1.0 km || 
|-id=367 bgcolor=#E9E9E9
| 387367 ||  || — || December 20, 2004 || Mount Lemmon || Mount Lemmon Survey || MAR || align=right | 1.7 km || 
|-id=368 bgcolor=#d6d6d6
| 387368 ||  || — || August 21, 2006 || Kitt Peak || Spacewatch || — || align=right | 2.7 km || 
|-id=369 bgcolor=#E9E9E9
| 387369 ||  || — || October 19, 2007 || Catalina || CSS || — || align=right | 3.0 km || 
|-id=370 bgcolor=#d6d6d6
| 387370 ||  || — || December 18, 2001 || Socorro || LINEAR || EOS || align=right | 2.5 km || 
|-id=371 bgcolor=#fefefe
| 387371 ||  || — || May 29, 2000 || Kitt Peak || Spacewatch || V || align=right data-sort-value="0.99" | 990 m || 
|-id=372 bgcolor=#d6d6d6
| 387372 ||  || — || September 11, 2006 || Catalina || CSS || — || align=right | 3.3 km || 
|-id=373 bgcolor=#d6d6d6
| 387373 ||  || — || January 29, 1993 || Kitt Peak || Spacewatch || EOS || align=right | 2.8 km || 
|-id=374 bgcolor=#d6d6d6
| 387374 ||  || — || December 21, 2008 || Mount Lemmon || Mount Lemmon Survey || CHA || align=right | 2.1 km || 
|-id=375 bgcolor=#E9E9E9
| 387375 ||  || — || March 2, 2006 || Mount Lemmon || Mount Lemmon Survey || — || align=right | 1.2 km || 
|-id=376 bgcolor=#d6d6d6
| 387376 ||  || — || November 12, 2007 || Mount Lemmon || Mount Lemmon Survey || — || align=right | 4.4 km || 
|-id=377 bgcolor=#E9E9E9
| 387377 ||  || — || April 21, 2006 || Kitt Peak || Spacewatch || — || align=right | 1.9 km || 
|-id=378 bgcolor=#d6d6d6
| 387378 ||  || — || June 11, 2010 || Mount Lemmon || Mount Lemmon Survey || — || align=right | 3.3 km || 
|-id=379 bgcolor=#E9E9E9
| 387379 ||  || — || April 25, 2006 || Kitt Peak || Spacewatch || — || align=right | 3.6 km || 
|-id=380 bgcolor=#d6d6d6
| 387380 ||  || — || November 25, 1997 || Kitt Peak || Spacewatch || KOR || align=right | 1.9 km || 
|-id=381 bgcolor=#C2FFFF
| 387381 ||  || — || September 21, 2009 || Kitt Peak || Spacewatch || L4 || align=right | 9.7 km || 
|-id=382 bgcolor=#C2FFFF
| 387382 ||  || — || February 12, 2002 || Kitt Peak || Spacewatch || L4 || align=right | 10 km || 
|-id=383 bgcolor=#C2FFFF
| 387383 ||  || — || September 20, 2009 || Kitt Peak || Spacewatch || L4 || align=right | 7.5 km || 
|-id=384 bgcolor=#C2FFFF
| 387384 ||  || — || March 23, 2002 || Kitt Peak || Spacewatch || L4 || align=right | 12 km || 
|-id=385 bgcolor=#C2FFFF
| 387385 ||  || — || December 31, 2000 || Kitt Peak || Spacewatch || L4 || align=right | 10 km || 
|-id=386 bgcolor=#C2FFFF
| 387386 ||  || — || July 29, 2008 || Kitt Peak || Spacewatch || L4 || align=right | 8.3 km || 
|-id=387 bgcolor=#E9E9E9
| 387387 ||  || — || December 7, 1999 || Socorro || LINEAR || ADE || align=right | 2.6 km || 
|-id=388 bgcolor=#C2FFFF
| 387388 ||  || — || October 15, 2009 || Catalina || CSS || L4 || align=right | 12 km || 
|-id=389 bgcolor=#C2FFFF
| 387389 ||  || — || June 18, 2006 || Kitt Peak || Spacewatch || L4 || align=right | 13 km || 
|-id=390 bgcolor=#C2FFFF
| 387390 ||  || — || November 6, 2010 || Mount Lemmon || Mount Lemmon Survey || L4ERY || align=right | 8.9 km || 
|-id=391 bgcolor=#C2FFFF
| 387391 ||  || — || May 13, 2005 || Kitt Peak || Spacewatch || L4 || align=right | 9.3 km || 
|-id=392 bgcolor=#C2FFFF
| 387392 ||  || — || October 17, 2010 || Mount Lemmon || Mount Lemmon Survey || L4 || align=right | 8.0 km || 
|-id=393 bgcolor=#C2FFFF
| 387393 ||  || — || March 27, 2003 || Kitt Peak || Spacewatch || L4 || align=right | 11 km || 
|-id=394 bgcolor=#fefefe
| 387394 ||  || — || February 3, 2006 || Kitt Peak || Spacewatch || V || align=right data-sort-value="0.68" | 680 m || 
|-id=395 bgcolor=#fefefe
| 387395 ||  || — || January 26, 2006 || Mount Lemmon || Mount Lemmon Survey || FLO || align=right data-sort-value="0.56" | 560 m || 
|-id=396 bgcolor=#d6d6d6
| 387396 ||  || — || September 17, 2010 || Mount Lemmon || Mount Lemmon Survey || ELF || align=right | 3.8 km || 
|-id=397 bgcolor=#fefefe
| 387397 ||  || — || November 13, 2006 || Catalina || CSS || V || align=right data-sort-value="0.82" | 820 m || 
|-id=398 bgcolor=#d6d6d6
| 387398 ||  || — || June 14, 2007 || Kitt Peak || Spacewatch || 615 || align=right | 1.8 km || 
|-id=399 bgcolor=#E9E9E9
| 387399 ||  || — || October 29, 2005 || Catalina || CSS || — || align=right | 1.4 km || 
|-id=400 bgcolor=#E9E9E9
| 387400 ||  || — || October 5, 2005 || Catalina || CSS || — || align=right data-sort-value="0.92" | 920 m || 
|}

387401–387500 

|-bgcolor=#fefefe
| 387401 ||  || — || August 31, 1998 || Kitt Peak || Spacewatch || — || align=right data-sort-value="0.94" | 940 m || 
|-id=402 bgcolor=#E9E9E9
| 387402 ||  || — || February 9, 2002 || Kitt Peak || Spacewatch || — || align=right | 2.0 km || 
|-id=403 bgcolor=#E9E9E9
| 387403 ||  || — || January 23, 2006 || Kitt Peak || Spacewatch || — || align=right | 2.5 km || 
|-id=404 bgcolor=#fefefe
| 387404 ||  || — || October 3, 2003 || Kitt Peak || Spacewatch || — || align=right data-sort-value="0.89" | 890 m || 
|-id=405 bgcolor=#fefefe
| 387405 ||  || — || September 21, 2009 || Catalina || CSS || — || align=right | 1.4 km || 
|-id=406 bgcolor=#E9E9E9
| 387406 ||  || — || September 24, 2004 || Socorro || LINEAR || — || align=right | 2.6 km || 
|-id=407 bgcolor=#d6d6d6
| 387407 ||  || — || October 21, 2008 || Kitt Peak || Spacewatch || URS || align=right | 6.1 km || 
|-id=408 bgcolor=#fefefe
| 387408 ||  || — || January 10, 2007 || Kitt Peak || Spacewatch || NYS || align=right data-sort-value="0.88" | 880 m || 
|-id=409 bgcolor=#E9E9E9
| 387409 ||  || — || January 25, 2006 || Kitt Peak || Spacewatch || — || align=right | 2.8 km || 
|-id=410 bgcolor=#E9E9E9
| 387410 ||  || — || October 9, 2004 || Kitt Peak || Spacewatch || — || align=right | 2.3 km || 
|-id=411 bgcolor=#E9E9E9
| 387411 ||  || — || October 7, 2004 || Kitt Peak || Spacewatch || — || align=right | 2.9 km || 
|-id=412 bgcolor=#E9E9E9
| 387412 ||  || — || October 6, 2004 || Kitt Peak || Spacewatch || — || align=right | 2.9 km || 
|-id=413 bgcolor=#fefefe
| 387413 ||  || — || February 27, 2000 || Kitt Peak || Spacewatch || MAS || align=right data-sort-value="0.76" | 760 m || 
|-id=414 bgcolor=#d6d6d6
| 387414 ||  || — || April 21, 2006 || Kitt Peak || Spacewatch || — || align=right | 3.4 km || 
|-id=415 bgcolor=#d6d6d6
| 387415 ||  || — || November 30, 2008 || Kitt Peak || Spacewatch || THM || align=right | 2.7 km || 
|-id=416 bgcolor=#d6d6d6
| 387416 ||  || — || September 9, 2007 || Mount Lemmon || Mount Lemmon Survey || — || align=right | 2.5 km || 
|-id=417 bgcolor=#E9E9E9
| 387417 ||  || — || November 3, 2004 || Kitt Peak || Spacewatch || — || align=right | 2.3 km || 
|-id=418 bgcolor=#d6d6d6
| 387418 ||  || — || September 8, 2007 || Anderson Mesa || LONEOS || EOS || align=right | 2.4 km || 
|-id=419 bgcolor=#E9E9E9
| 387419 ||  || — || September 20, 2000 || Socorro || LINEAR || — || align=right | 2.3 km || 
|-id=420 bgcolor=#d6d6d6
| 387420 ||  || — || November 21, 2003 || Socorro || LINEAR || — || align=right | 5.1 km || 
|-id=421 bgcolor=#E9E9E9
| 387421 ||  || — || November 25, 2009 || Mount Lemmon || Mount Lemmon Survey || — || align=right | 3.5 km || 
|-id=422 bgcolor=#d6d6d6
| 387422 ||  || — || November 6, 2008 || Mount Lemmon || Mount Lemmon Survey || TEL || align=right | 1.9 km || 
|-id=423 bgcolor=#fefefe
| 387423 ||  || — || October 1, 2003 || Anderson Mesa || LONEOS || — || align=right data-sort-value="0.77" | 770 m || 
|-id=424 bgcolor=#fefefe
| 387424 ||  || — || January 8, 2003 || Socorro || LINEAR || — || align=right data-sort-value="0.89" | 890 m || 
|-id=425 bgcolor=#E9E9E9
| 387425 ||  || — || January 22, 2006 || Anderson Mesa || LONEOS || — || align=right | 1.6 km || 
|-id=426 bgcolor=#E9E9E9
| 387426 ||  || — || June 29, 2004 || Siding Spring || SSS || EUN || align=right | 1.7 km || 
|-id=427 bgcolor=#E9E9E9
| 387427 ||  || — || February 11, 2002 || Anderson Mesa || LONEOS || BAR || align=right | 1.3 km || 
|-id=428 bgcolor=#d6d6d6
| 387428 ||  || — || September 15, 2007 || Mount Lemmon || Mount Lemmon Survey || — || align=right | 3.1 km || 
|-id=429 bgcolor=#d6d6d6
| 387429 ||  || — || October 11, 2007 || Catalina || CSS || — || align=right | 4.0 km || 
|-id=430 bgcolor=#fefefe
| 387430 ||  || — || June 8, 2005 || Kitt Peak || Spacewatch || — || align=right data-sort-value="0.90" | 900 m || 
|-id=431 bgcolor=#E9E9E9
| 387431 ||  || — || December 8, 2005 || Catalina || CSS || — || align=right | 3.7 km || 
|-id=432 bgcolor=#d6d6d6
| 387432 ||  || — || January 24, 1998 || Kitt Peak || Spacewatch || — || align=right | 5.6 km || 
|-id=433 bgcolor=#fefefe
| 387433 ||  || — || October 25, 2005 || Mount Lemmon || Mount Lemmon Survey || — || align=right data-sort-value="0.94" | 940 m || 
|-id=434 bgcolor=#E9E9E9
| 387434 ||  || — || September 3, 2008 || Kitt Peak || Spacewatch || — || align=right | 2.3 km || 
|-id=435 bgcolor=#d6d6d6
| 387435 ||  || — || December 5, 2008 || Mount Lemmon || Mount Lemmon Survey || — || align=right | 3.7 km || 
|-id=436 bgcolor=#fefefe
| 387436 ||  || — || April 3, 2008 || Mount Lemmon || Mount Lemmon Survey || V || align=right data-sort-value="0.72" | 720 m || 
|-id=437 bgcolor=#d6d6d6
| 387437 ||  || — || January 13, 2004 || Kitt Peak || Spacewatch || — || align=right | 2.9 km || 
|-id=438 bgcolor=#E9E9E9
| 387438 ||  || — || March 2, 2006 || Mount Lemmon || Mount Lemmon Survey || — || align=right | 2.2 km || 
|-id=439 bgcolor=#E9E9E9
| 387439 ||  || — || September 16, 2004 || Kitt Peak || Spacewatch || — || align=right | 3.4 km || 
|-id=440 bgcolor=#d6d6d6
| 387440 ||  || — || January 13, 2004 || Kitt Peak || Spacewatch || — || align=right | 2.4 km || 
|-id=441 bgcolor=#E9E9E9
| 387441 ||  || — || May 9, 2002 || Socorro || LINEAR || JUN || align=right | 1.4 km || 
|-id=442 bgcolor=#E9E9E9
| 387442 ||  || — || March 25, 2007 || Mount Lemmon || Mount Lemmon Survey || MAR || align=right | 1.6 km || 
|-id=443 bgcolor=#d6d6d6
| 387443 ||  || — || September 12, 2007 || Mount Lemmon || Mount Lemmon Survey || HYG || align=right | 2.8 km || 
|-id=444 bgcolor=#fefefe
| 387444 ||  || — || September 19, 2009 || Kitt Peak || Spacewatch || NYS || align=right data-sort-value="0.65" | 650 m || 
|-id=445 bgcolor=#E9E9E9
| 387445 ||  || — || January 28, 2007 || Mount Lemmon || Mount Lemmon Survey || — || align=right | 2.0 km || 
|-id=446 bgcolor=#E9E9E9
| 387446 ||  || — || December 10, 2004 || Socorro || LINEAR || — || align=right | 3.7 km || 
|-id=447 bgcolor=#fefefe
| 387447 ||  || — || August 30, 1998 || Anderson Mesa || LONEOS || — || align=right | 1.1 km || 
|-id=448 bgcolor=#d6d6d6
| 387448 ||  || — || May 28, 2000 || Socorro || LINEAR || — || align=right | 3.4 km || 
|-id=449 bgcolor=#E9E9E9
| 387449 ||  || — || November 10, 2009 || Mount Lemmon || Mount Lemmon Survey || — || align=right | 1.7 km || 
|-id=450 bgcolor=#fefefe
| 387450 ||  || — || March 11, 2005 || Mount Lemmon || Mount Lemmon Survey || — || align=right data-sort-value="0.60" | 600 m || 
|-id=451 bgcolor=#d6d6d6
| 387451 ||  || — || April 4, 2005 || Catalina || CSS || TEL || align=right | 1.8 km || 
|-id=452 bgcolor=#E9E9E9
| 387452 ||  || — || May 23, 2003 || Kitt Peak || Spacewatch || — || align=right | 2.0 km || 
|-id=453 bgcolor=#E9E9E9
| 387453 ||  || — || August 23, 2004 || Kitt Peak || Spacewatch || — || align=right | 1.0 km || 
|-id=454 bgcolor=#fefefe
| 387454 ||  || — || September 22, 2009 || Kitt Peak || Spacewatch || — || align=right data-sort-value="0.98" | 980 m || 
|-id=455 bgcolor=#E9E9E9
| 387455 ||  || — || January 14, 2010 || Kitt Peak || Spacewatch || — || align=right | 3.1 km || 
|-id=456 bgcolor=#E9E9E9
| 387456 ||  || — || September 24, 2004 || Kitt Peak || Spacewatch || — || align=right | 1.2 km || 
|-id=457 bgcolor=#d6d6d6
| 387457 ||  || — || November 2, 2008 || Mount Lemmon || Mount Lemmon Survey || — || align=right | 3.4 km || 
|-id=458 bgcolor=#E9E9E9
| 387458 ||  || — || December 10, 2004 || Socorro || LINEAR || — || align=right | 2.3 km || 
|-id=459 bgcolor=#fefefe
| 387459 ||  || — || January 13, 2008 || Kitt Peak || Spacewatch || — || align=right data-sort-value="0.97" | 970 m || 
|-id=460 bgcolor=#d6d6d6
| 387460 ||  || — || October 27, 2005 || Kitt Peak || Spacewatch || SYL7:4 || align=right | 4.3 km || 
|-id=461 bgcolor=#E9E9E9
| 387461 ||  || — || December 29, 2000 || Kitt Peak || Spacewatch || GER || align=right | 1.7 km || 
|-id=462 bgcolor=#E9E9E9
| 387462 ||  || — || December 10, 2004 || Socorro || LINEAR || — || align=right | 2.9 km || 
|-id=463 bgcolor=#d6d6d6
| 387463 ||  || — || April 5, 2005 || Mount Lemmon || Mount Lemmon Survey || — || align=right | 4.2 km || 
|-id=464 bgcolor=#E9E9E9
| 387464 ||  || — || October 2, 2000 || Anderson Mesa || LONEOS || EUN || align=right | 1.7 km || 
|-id=465 bgcolor=#d6d6d6
| 387465 ||  || — || September 12, 2007 || Mount Lemmon || Mount Lemmon Survey || THM || align=right | 1.9 km || 
|-id=466 bgcolor=#E9E9E9
| 387466 ||  || — || November 1, 2000 || Socorro || LINEAR || — || align=right | 1.9 km || 
|-id=467 bgcolor=#d6d6d6
| 387467 ||  || — || October 8, 2007 || Kitt Peak || Spacewatch || HYG || align=right | 2.7 km || 
|-id=468 bgcolor=#E9E9E9
| 387468 ||  || — || November 10, 2004 || Kitt Peak || Spacewatch || — || align=right | 1.9 km || 
|-id=469 bgcolor=#E9E9E9
| 387469 ||  || — || November 6, 2008 || Catalina || CSS || — || align=right | 2.6 km || 
|-id=470 bgcolor=#fefefe
| 387470 ||  || — || August 30, 2005 || Kitt Peak || Spacewatch || MAS || align=right data-sort-value="0.76" | 760 m || 
|-id=471 bgcolor=#E9E9E9
| 387471 ||  || — || December 12, 2004 || Kitt Peak || Spacewatch || — || align=right | 2.6 km || 
|-id=472 bgcolor=#fefefe
| 387472 ||  || — || November 30, 2005 || Kitt Peak || Spacewatch || — || align=right | 1.1 km || 
|-id=473 bgcolor=#d6d6d6
| 387473 ||  || — || July 2, 2011 || Mount Lemmon || Mount Lemmon Survey || — || align=right | 3.7 km || 
|-id=474 bgcolor=#fefefe
| 387474 ||  || — || February 9, 2007 || Kitt Peak || Spacewatch || MAS || align=right data-sort-value="0.76" | 760 m || 
|-id=475 bgcolor=#E9E9E9
| 387475 ||  || — || January 23, 2006 || Catalina || CSS || — || align=right | 1.5 km || 
|-id=476 bgcolor=#fefefe
| 387476 ||  || — || November 15, 2006 || Mount Lemmon || Mount Lemmon Survey || — || align=right | 1.1 km || 
|-id=477 bgcolor=#d6d6d6
| 387477 ||  || — || January 5, 2003 || Socorro || LINEAR || — || align=right | 3.7 km || 
|-id=478 bgcolor=#E9E9E9
| 387478 ||  || — || July 29, 2008 || Kitt Peak || Spacewatch || — || align=right | 1.4 km || 
|-id=479 bgcolor=#fefefe
| 387479 ||  || — || January 26, 2007 || Kitt Peak || Spacewatch || V || align=right data-sort-value="0.63" | 630 m || 
|-id=480 bgcolor=#fefefe
| 387480 ||  || — || January 31, 2004 || Kitt Peak || Spacewatch || — || align=right data-sort-value="0.71" | 710 m || 
|-id=481 bgcolor=#E9E9E9
| 387481 ||  || — || December 9, 2004 || Kitt Peak || Spacewatch || — || align=right | 2.6 km || 
|-id=482 bgcolor=#d6d6d6
| 387482 ||  || — || October 14, 2007 || Catalina || CSS || — || align=right | 4.2 km || 
|-id=483 bgcolor=#fefefe
| 387483 ||  || — || January 2, 2003 || Socorro || LINEAR || — || align=right | 1.9 km || 
|-id=484 bgcolor=#fefefe
| 387484 ||  || — || March 29, 2000 || Socorro || LINEAR || — || align=right | 1.1 km || 
|-id=485 bgcolor=#E9E9E9
| 387485 ||  || — || December 10, 2004 || Socorro || LINEAR || BRU || align=right | 5.8 km || 
|-id=486 bgcolor=#E9E9E9
| 387486 ||  || — || June 16, 2004 || Kitt Peak || Spacewatch || — || align=right | 1.0 km || 
|-id=487 bgcolor=#FA8072
| 387487 || 4169 T-3 || — || October 16, 1977 || Palomar || PLS || — || align=right data-sort-value="0.87" | 870 m || 
|-id=488 bgcolor=#E9E9E9
| 387488 ||  || — || January 12, 1994 || Kitt Peak || Spacewatch || — || align=right | 1.2 km || 
|-id=489 bgcolor=#E9E9E9
| 387489 ||  || — || October 4, 1994 || Kitt Peak || Spacewatch || — || align=right | 1.5 km || 
|-id=490 bgcolor=#E9E9E9
| 387490 ||  || — || January 29, 1995 || Kitt Peak || Spacewatch || HNA || align=right | 2.5 km || 
|-id=491 bgcolor=#fefefe
| 387491 ||  || — || August 22, 1995 || Kitt Peak || Spacewatch || — || align=right data-sort-value="0.83" | 830 m || 
|-id=492 bgcolor=#E9E9E9
| 387492 ||  || — || September 19, 1995 || Kitt Peak || Spacewatch || AER || align=right | 1.5 km || 
|-id=493 bgcolor=#d6d6d6
| 387493 ||  || — || September 25, 1995 || Kitt Peak || Spacewatch || — || align=right | 3.2 km || 
|-id=494 bgcolor=#d6d6d6
| 387494 ||  || — || September 23, 1995 || Kitt Peak || Spacewatch || — || align=right | 2.4 km || 
|-id=495 bgcolor=#E9E9E9
| 387495 ||  || — || September 25, 1995 || Kitt Peak || Spacewatch || — || align=right | 1.7 km || 
|-id=496 bgcolor=#d6d6d6
| 387496 ||  || — || October 15, 1995 || Kitt Peak || Spacewatch || — || align=right | 2.5 km || 
|-id=497 bgcolor=#fefefe
| 387497 ||  || — || October 24, 1995 || Kitt Peak || Spacewatch || — || align=right data-sort-value="0.98" | 980 m || 
|-id=498 bgcolor=#E9E9E9
| 387498 ||  || — || November 14, 1995 || Kitt Peak || Spacewatch || — || align=right | 1.5 km || 
|-id=499 bgcolor=#d6d6d6
| 387499 ||  || — || November 11, 1996 || Kitt Peak || Spacewatch || EOS || align=right | 4.9 km || 
|-id=500 bgcolor=#d6d6d6
| 387500 ||  || — || December 4, 1996 || Kitt Peak || Spacewatch || — || align=right | 3.1 km || 
|}

387501–387600 

|-bgcolor=#d6d6d6
| 387501 ||  || — || November 14, 1996 || Kitt Peak || Spacewatch || 7:4 || align=right | 3.7 km || 
|-id=502 bgcolor=#fefefe
| 387502 ||  || — || February 3, 1997 || Kitt Peak || Spacewatch || — || align=right data-sort-value="0.62" | 620 m || 
|-id=503 bgcolor=#E9E9E9
| 387503 ||  || — || September 23, 1997 || Kitt Peak || Spacewatch || INO || align=right | 1.3 km || 
|-id=504 bgcolor=#E9E9E9
| 387504 ||  || — || February 17, 1998 || Kitt Peak || Spacewatch || — || align=right data-sort-value="0.87" | 870 m || 
|-id=505 bgcolor=#FFC2E0
| 387505 ||  || — || May 24, 1998 || Socorro || LINEAR || APOPHA || align=right | 1.1 km || 
|-id=506 bgcolor=#d6d6d6
| 387506 ||  || — || May 19, 1998 || Kitt Peak || Spacewatch || — || align=right | 2.8 km || 
|-id=507 bgcolor=#fefefe
| 387507 ||  || — || September 12, 1998 || Kitt Peak || Spacewatch || — || align=right data-sort-value="0.89" | 890 m || 
|-id=508 bgcolor=#fefefe
| 387508 ||  || — || October 12, 1998 || Kitt Peak || Spacewatch || — || align=right data-sort-value="0.56" | 560 m || 
|-id=509 bgcolor=#fefefe
| 387509 ||  || — || October 14, 1998 || Kitt Peak || Spacewatch || V || align=right data-sort-value="0.65" | 650 m || 
|-id=510 bgcolor=#E9E9E9
| 387510 ||  || — || November 26, 1998 || Kitt Peak || Spacewatch || — || align=right | 1.9 km || 
|-id=511 bgcolor=#fefefe
| 387511 ||  || — || January 13, 1999 || Kitt Peak || Spacewatch || — || align=right data-sort-value="0.83" | 830 m || 
|-id=512 bgcolor=#E9E9E9
| 387512 ||  || — || July 12, 1999 || Socorro || LINEAR || — || align=right | 4.1 km || 
|-id=513 bgcolor=#fefefe
| 387513 ||  || — || September 11, 1999 || Socorro || LINEAR || — || align=right | 1.5 km || 
|-id=514 bgcolor=#FA8072
| 387514 ||  || — || September 10, 1999 || Socorro || LINEAR || — || align=right data-sort-value="0.68" | 680 m || 
|-id=515 bgcolor=#fefefe
| 387515 ||  || — || September 18, 1999 || Kitt Peak || Spacewatch || — || align=right data-sort-value="0.78" | 780 m || 
|-id=516 bgcolor=#E9E9E9
| 387516 ||  || — || October 1, 1999 || Anderson Mesa || LONEOS || IAN || align=right | 1.7 km || 
|-id=517 bgcolor=#E9E9E9
| 387517 ||  || — || October 4, 1999 || Kitt Peak || Spacewatch || — || align=right | 1.1 km || 
|-id=518 bgcolor=#E9E9E9
| 387518 ||  || — || September 5, 1999 || Anderson Mesa || LONEOS || — || align=right | 2.0 km || 
|-id=519 bgcolor=#fefefe
| 387519 ||  || — || October 6, 1999 || Socorro || LINEAR || H || align=right data-sort-value="0.65" | 650 m || 
|-id=520 bgcolor=#E9E9E9
| 387520 ||  || — || October 6, 1999 || Socorro || LINEAR || EUN || align=right | 1.3 km || 
|-id=521 bgcolor=#fefefe
| 387521 ||  || — || October 31, 1999 || Kitt Peak || Spacewatch || — || align=right data-sort-value="0.74" | 740 m || 
|-id=522 bgcolor=#E9E9E9
| 387522 ||  || — || November 9, 1999 || Kitt Peak || Spacewatch || — || align=right | 1.4 km || 
|-id=523 bgcolor=#E9E9E9
| 387523 ||  || — || November 10, 1999 || Kitt Peak || Spacewatch || — || align=right | 1.1 km || 
|-id=524 bgcolor=#E9E9E9
| 387524 ||  || — || November 4, 1999 || Anderson Mesa || LONEOS || — || align=right | 3.1 km || 
|-id=525 bgcolor=#E9E9E9
| 387525 ||  || — || December 8, 1999 || Socorro || LINEAR || — || align=right | 1.7 km || 
|-id=526 bgcolor=#fefefe
| 387526 ||  || — || January 4, 2000 || Socorro || LINEAR || H || align=right data-sort-value="0.79" | 790 m || 
|-id=527 bgcolor=#E9E9E9
| 387527 ||  || — || February 2, 2000 || Kitt Peak || Spacewatch || — || align=right | 2.3 km || 
|-id=528 bgcolor=#E9E9E9
| 387528 ||  || — || February 12, 2000 || Apache Point || SDSS || — || align=right | 2.0 km || 
|-id=529 bgcolor=#fefefe
| 387529 ||  || — || February 29, 2000 || Socorro || LINEAR || PHO || align=right data-sort-value="0.95" | 950 m || 
|-id=530 bgcolor=#E9E9E9
| 387530 ||  || — || February 29, 2000 || Socorro || LINEAR || — || align=right | 3.0 km || 
|-id=531 bgcolor=#fefefe
| 387531 ||  || — || March 29, 2000 || Kitt Peak || Spacewatch || NYS || align=right data-sort-value="0.60" | 600 m || 
|-id=532 bgcolor=#fefefe
| 387532 ||  || — || March 29, 2000 || Socorro || LINEAR || PHO || align=right | 1.2 km || 
|-id=533 bgcolor=#E9E9E9
| 387533 ||  || — || March 29, 2000 || Kitt Peak || Kitt Peak Obs. || — || align=right | 2.6 km || 
|-id=534 bgcolor=#fefefe
| 387534 ||  || — || April 3, 2000 || Kitt Peak || Spacewatch || fast? || align=right data-sort-value="0.71" | 710 m || 
|-id=535 bgcolor=#fefefe
| 387535 ||  || — || August 31, 2000 || Socorro || LINEAR || — || align=right | 1.1 km || 
|-id=536 bgcolor=#E9E9E9
| 387536 ||  || — || August 31, 2000 || Socorro || LINEAR || EUN || align=right | 1.5 km || 
|-id=537 bgcolor=#fefefe
| 387537 ||  || — || August 29, 2000 || Socorro || LINEAR || — || align=right data-sort-value="0.92" | 920 m || 
|-id=538 bgcolor=#E9E9E9
| 387538 ||  || — || September 25, 2000 || Socorro || LINEAR || — || align=right | 1.0 km || 
|-id=539 bgcolor=#E9E9E9
| 387539 ||  || — || September 20, 2000 || Socorro || LINEAR || — || align=right | 1.5 km || 
|-id=540 bgcolor=#E9E9E9
| 387540 ||  || — || October 25, 2000 || Socorro || LINEAR || — || align=right | 1.0 km || 
|-id=541 bgcolor=#FA8072
| 387541 ||  || — || November 9, 2000 || Socorro || LINEAR || — || align=right | 2.0 km || 
|-id=542 bgcolor=#E9E9E9
| 387542 ||  || — || November 20, 2000 || Socorro || LINEAR || EUN || align=right | 1.4 km || 
|-id=543 bgcolor=#E9E9E9
| 387543 ||  || — || November 20, 2000 || Socorro || LINEAR || — || align=right | 1.2 km || 
|-id=544 bgcolor=#E9E9E9
| 387544 ||  || — || December 5, 2000 || Socorro || LINEAR || HNS || align=right | 1.6 km || 
|-id=545 bgcolor=#E9E9E9
| 387545 ||  || — || January 15, 2001 || Socorro || LINEAR || — || align=right | 2.7 km || 
|-id=546 bgcolor=#E9E9E9
| 387546 ||  || — || December 29, 2000 || Anderson Mesa || LONEOS || IAN || align=right | 1.1 km || 
|-id=547 bgcolor=#E9E9E9
| 387547 ||  || — || January 18, 2001 || Socorro || LINEAR || — || align=right | 1.2 km || 
|-id=548 bgcolor=#E9E9E9
| 387548 ||  || — || January 4, 2001 || Socorro || LINEAR || JUN || align=right | 1.4 km || 
|-id=549 bgcolor=#E9E9E9
| 387549 ||  || — || January 19, 2001 || Socorro || LINEAR || — || align=right | 2.0 km || 
|-id=550 bgcolor=#E9E9E9
| 387550 ||  || — || March 26, 2001 || Socorro || LINEAR || JUN || align=right | 1.2 km || 
|-id=551 bgcolor=#E9E9E9
| 387551 ||  || — || March 25, 2001 || Kitt Peak || M. W. Buie || — || align=right | 1.8 km || 
|-id=552 bgcolor=#E9E9E9
| 387552 ||  || — || March 21, 2001 || Kitt Peak || Spacewatch || EUN || align=right | 1.4 km || 
|-id=553 bgcolor=#fefefe
| 387553 ||  || — || August 15, 2001 || Haleakala || NEAT || — || align=right data-sort-value="0.75" | 750 m || 
|-id=554 bgcolor=#FA8072
| 387554 ||  || — || August 17, 2001 || Socorro || LINEAR || — || align=right data-sort-value="0.83" | 830 m || 
|-id=555 bgcolor=#E9E9E9
| 387555 ||  || — || August 19, 2001 || Socorro || LINEAR || — || align=right | 2.9 km || 
|-id=556 bgcolor=#d6d6d6
| 387556 ||  || — || August 22, 2001 || Socorro || LINEAR || EUP || align=right | 5.6 km || 
|-id=557 bgcolor=#d6d6d6
| 387557 ||  || — || September 10, 2001 || Socorro || LINEAR || 3:2 || align=right | 5.2 km || 
|-id=558 bgcolor=#d6d6d6
| 387558 ||  || — || September 11, 2001 || Socorro || LINEAR || BRA || align=right | 1.3 km || 
|-id=559 bgcolor=#fefefe
| 387559 ||  || — || September 12, 2001 || Socorro || LINEAR || MAS || align=right data-sort-value="0.84" | 840 m || 
|-id=560 bgcolor=#d6d6d6
| 387560 ||  || — || September 12, 2001 || Socorro || LINEAR || TRP || align=right | 2.9 km || 
|-id=561 bgcolor=#fefefe
| 387561 ||  || — || September 18, 2001 || Kitt Peak || Spacewatch || — || align=right data-sort-value="0.83" | 830 m || 
|-id=562 bgcolor=#fefefe
| 387562 ||  || — || September 16, 2001 || Socorro || LINEAR || NYS || align=right data-sort-value="0.78" | 780 m || 
|-id=563 bgcolor=#fefefe
| 387563 ||  || — || September 17, 2001 || Socorro || LINEAR || — || align=right | 1.2 km || 
|-id=564 bgcolor=#fefefe
| 387564 ||  || — || September 16, 2001 || Socorro || LINEAR || FLO || align=right data-sort-value="0.92" | 920 m || 
|-id=565 bgcolor=#fefefe
| 387565 ||  || — || September 19, 2001 || Socorro || LINEAR || — || align=right data-sort-value="0.94" | 940 m || 
|-id=566 bgcolor=#fefefe
| 387566 ||  || — || September 19, 2001 || Socorro || LINEAR || MAS || align=right data-sort-value="0.71" | 710 m || 
|-id=567 bgcolor=#d6d6d6
| 387567 ||  || — || September 19, 2001 || Socorro || LINEAR || EUP || align=right | 4.1 km || 
|-id=568 bgcolor=#d6d6d6
| 387568 ||  || — || August 23, 2001 || Socorro || LINEAR || EUP || align=right | 3.6 km || 
|-id=569 bgcolor=#fefefe
| 387569 ||  || — || September 22, 2001 || Kitt Peak || Spacewatch || — || align=right data-sort-value="0.89" | 890 m || 
|-id=570 bgcolor=#d6d6d6
| 387570 ||  || — || September 16, 2001 || Socorro || LINEAR || HIL3:2 || align=right | 7.6 km || 
|-id=571 bgcolor=#d6d6d6
| 387571 ||  || — || September 19, 2001 || Kitt Peak || Spacewatch || KOR || align=right | 1.3 km || 
|-id=572 bgcolor=#d6d6d6
| 387572 ||  || — || September 21, 2001 || Anderson Mesa || LONEOS || — || align=right | 3.8 km || 
|-id=573 bgcolor=#fefefe
| 387573 ||  || — || October 8, 2001 || Palomar || NEAT || MAS || align=right data-sort-value="0.83" | 830 m || 
|-id=574 bgcolor=#d6d6d6
| 387574 ||  || — || October 11, 2001 || Socorro || LINEAR || — || align=right | 3.4 km || 
|-id=575 bgcolor=#fefefe
| 387575 ||  || — || October 14, 2001 || Socorro || LINEAR || — || align=right | 1.0 km || 
|-id=576 bgcolor=#d6d6d6
| 387576 ||  || — || October 14, 2001 || Socorro || LINEAR || 637 || align=right | 3.2 km || 
|-id=577 bgcolor=#d6d6d6
| 387577 ||  || — || October 10, 2001 || Palomar || NEAT || — || align=right | 3.2 km || 
|-id=578 bgcolor=#fefefe
| 387578 ||  || — || October 14, 2001 || Socorro || LINEAR || FLO || align=right data-sort-value="0.79" | 790 m || 
|-id=579 bgcolor=#fefefe
| 387579 ||  || — || October 14, 2001 || Socorro || LINEAR || — || align=right data-sort-value="0.90" | 900 m || 
|-id=580 bgcolor=#fefefe
| 387580 ||  || — || October 11, 2001 || Socorro || LINEAR || — || align=right data-sort-value="0.98" | 980 m || 
|-id=581 bgcolor=#d6d6d6
| 387581 ||  || — || October 13, 2001 || Palomar || NEAT || EOS || align=right | 2.1 km || 
|-id=582 bgcolor=#fefefe
| 387582 ||  || — || October 13, 2001 || Palomar || NEAT || — || align=right | 1.3 km || 
|-id=583 bgcolor=#fefefe
| 387583 ||  || — || October 8, 2001 || Palomar || NEAT || — || align=right data-sort-value="0.89" | 890 m || 
|-id=584 bgcolor=#fefefe
| 387584 ||  || — || October 17, 2001 || Kitt Peak || Spacewatch || — || align=right data-sort-value="0.86" | 860 m || 
|-id=585 bgcolor=#fefefe
| 387585 ||  || — || October 20, 2001 || Socorro || LINEAR || NYS || align=right data-sort-value="0.85" | 850 m || 
|-id=586 bgcolor=#d6d6d6
| 387586 ||  || — || September 19, 2001 || Kitt Peak || Spacewatch || — || align=right | 2.7 km || 
|-id=587 bgcolor=#fefefe
| 387587 ||  || — || October 14, 2001 || Kitt Peak || Spacewatch || — || align=right data-sort-value="0.83" | 830 m || 
|-id=588 bgcolor=#d6d6d6
| 387588 ||  || — || September 17, 1995 || Kitt Peak || Spacewatch || — || align=right | 3.5 km || 
|-id=589 bgcolor=#fefefe
| 387589 ||  || — || October 23, 2001 || Socorro || LINEAR || NYS || align=right data-sort-value="0.72" | 720 m || 
|-id=590 bgcolor=#fefefe
| 387590 ||  || — || November 10, 2001 || Socorro || LINEAR || — || align=right | 1.1 km || 
|-id=591 bgcolor=#fefefe
| 387591 ||  || — || November 11, 2001 || Apache Point || SDSS || V || align=right data-sort-value="0.72" | 720 m || 
|-id=592 bgcolor=#d6d6d6
| 387592 ||  || — || November 18, 2001 || Socorro || LINEAR || MEL || align=right | 4.0 km || 
|-id=593 bgcolor=#d6d6d6
| 387593 ||  || — || November 17, 2001 || Socorro || LINEAR || — || align=right | 3.1 km || 
|-id=594 bgcolor=#d6d6d6
| 387594 ||  || — || November 17, 2001 || Socorro || LINEAR || — || align=right | 4.1 km || 
|-id=595 bgcolor=#fefefe
| 387595 ||  || — || December 11, 2001 || Socorro || LINEAR || — || align=right | 1.1 km || 
|-id=596 bgcolor=#d6d6d6
| 387596 ||  || — || December 14, 2001 || Socorro || LINEAR || — || align=right | 3.1 km || 
|-id=597 bgcolor=#fefefe
| 387597 ||  || — || December 14, 2001 || Socorro || LINEAR || NYS || align=right data-sort-value="0.70" | 700 m || 
|-id=598 bgcolor=#fefefe
| 387598 ||  || — || December 14, 2001 || Socorro || LINEAR || V || align=right data-sort-value="0.75" | 750 m || 
|-id=599 bgcolor=#E9E9E9
| 387599 ||  || — || December 14, 2001 || Socorro || LINEAR || — || align=right | 1.2 km || 
|-id=600 bgcolor=#d6d6d6
| 387600 ||  || — || November 9, 2001 || Socorro || LINEAR || — || align=right | 3.9 km || 
|}

387601–387700 

|-bgcolor=#E9E9E9
| 387601 ||  || — || December 17, 2001 || Socorro || LINEAR || — || align=right | 2.0 km || 
|-id=602 bgcolor=#d6d6d6
| 387602 ||  || — || January 13, 2002 || Socorro || LINEAR || — || align=right | 4.6 km || 
|-id=603 bgcolor=#E9E9E9
| 387603 ||  || — || February 7, 2002 || Socorro || LINEAR || — || align=right data-sort-value="0.98" | 980 m || 
|-id=604 bgcolor=#d6d6d6
| 387604 ||  || — || February 10, 2002 || Socorro || LINEAR || HYG || align=right | 3.0 km || 
|-id=605 bgcolor=#C2FFFF
| 387605 ||  || — || February 10, 2002 || Socorro || LINEAR || L4 || align=right | 9.9 km || 
|-id=606 bgcolor=#d6d6d6
| 387606 ||  || — || February 9, 2002 || Kitt Peak || Spacewatch || — || align=right | 2.6 km || 
|-id=607 bgcolor=#FA8072
| 387607 ||  || — || February 22, 2002 || Palomar || NEAT || — || align=right data-sort-value="0.79" | 790 m || 
|-id=608 bgcolor=#C2FFFF
| 387608 ||  || — || March 11, 2002 || Palomar || NEAT || L4 || align=right | 16 km || 
|-id=609 bgcolor=#d6d6d6
| 387609 ||  || — || March 11, 2002 || Palomar || NEAT || — || align=right | 3.4 km || 
|-id=610 bgcolor=#E9E9E9
| 387610 ||  || — || March 11, 2002 || Kitt Peak || Spacewatch || — || align=right | 1.1 km || 
|-id=611 bgcolor=#E9E9E9
| 387611 ||  || — || March 11, 2002 || Kitt Peak || Spacewatch || — || align=right data-sort-value="0.88" | 880 m || 
|-id=612 bgcolor=#E9E9E9
| 387612 ||  || — || March 11, 2002 || Kitt Peak || Spacewatch || — || align=right data-sort-value="0.64" | 640 m || 
|-id=613 bgcolor=#E9E9E9
| 387613 ||  || — || March 13, 2002 || Palomar || NEAT || — || align=right | 1.7 km || 
|-id=614 bgcolor=#E9E9E9
| 387614 ||  || — || March 10, 2002 || Kitt Peak || Spacewatch || — || align=right data-sort-value="0.94" | 940 m || 
|-id=615 bgcolor=#E9E9E9
| 387615 ||  || — || March 10, 2002 || Kitt Peak || Spacewatch || — || align=right data-sort-value="0.73" | 730 m || 
|-id=616 bgcolor=#d6d6d6
| 387616 ||  || — || March 18, 2002 || Kitt Peak || Spacewatch || — || align=right | 2.9 km || 
|-id=617 bgcolor=#E9E9E9
| 387617 ||  || — || April 13, 2002 || Kitt Peak || Spacewatch || — || align=right data-sort-value="0.88" | 880 m || 
|-id=618 bgcolor=#E9E9E9
| 387618 ||  || — || April 4, 2002 || Palomar || NEAT || — || align=right data-sort-value="0.86" | 860 m || 
|-id=619 bgcolor=#E9E9E9
| 387619 ||  || — || April 5, 2002 || Anderson Mesa || LONEOS || — || align=right data-sort-value="0.95" | 950 m || 
|-id=620 bgcolor=#E9E9E9
| 387620 ||  || — || April 13, 2002 || Palomar || NEAT || — || align=right data-sort-value="0.88" | 880 m || 
|-id=621 bgcolor=#E9E9E9
| 387621 ||  || — || April 13, 2002 || Palomar || NEAT || — || align=right | 1.2 km || 
|-id=622 bgcolor=#E9E9E9
| 387622 ||  || — || April 15, 2002 || Palomar || NEAT || EUN || align=right | 1.2 km || 
|-id=623 bgcolor=#E9E9E9
| 387623 ||  || — || April 30, 2002 || Palomar || NEAT || — || align=right | 1.3 km || 
|-id=624 bgcolor=#E9E9E9
| 387624 ||  || — || May 9, 2002 || Desert Eagle || W. K. Y. Yeung || — || align=right | 1.4 km || 
|-id=625 bgcolor=#E9E9E9
| 387625 ||  || — || May 8, 2002 || Socorro || LINEAR || — || align=right | 2.5 km || 
|-id=626 bgcolor=#E9E9E9
| 387626 ||  || — || May 5, 2002 || Palomar || NEAT || — || align=right | 2.7 km || 
|-id=627 bgcolor=#E9E9E9
| 387627 ||  || — || May 7, 2002 || Palomar || NEAT || — || align=right | 1.1 km || 
|-id=628 bgcolor=#E9E9E9
| 387628 ||  || — || July 9, 2002 || Socorro || LINEAR || — || align=right | 1.2 km || 
|-id=629 bgcolor=#E9E9E9
| 387629 ||  || — || July 2, 2002 || Palomar || NEAT || EUN || align=right | 1.7 km || 
|-id=630 bgcolor=#E9E9E9
| 387630 ||  || — || July 18, 2002 || Socorro || LINEAR || — || align=right | 2.6 km || 
|-id=631 bgcolor=#fefefe
| 387631 ||  || — || August 2, 2002 || Needville || Needville Obs. || — || align=right data-sort-value="0.82" | 820 m || 
|-id=632 bgcolor=#FA8072
| 387632 ||  || — || August 9, 2002 || Socorro || LINEAR || — || align=right | 2.3 km || 
|-id=633 bgcolor=#FA8072
| 387633 ||  || — || August 3, 2002 || Campo Imperatore || CINEOS || H || align=right data-sort-value="0.53" | 530 m || 
|-id=634 bgcolor=#E9E9E9
| 387634 ||  || — || August 6, 2002 || Palomar || NEAT || — || align=right | 2.2 km || 
|-id=635 bgcolor=#E9E9E9
| 387635 ||  || — || August 14, 2002 || Socorro || LINEAR || — || align=right | 2.9 km || 
|-id=636 bgcolor=#E9E9E9
| 387636 ||  || — || August 11, 2002 || Palomar || NEAT || PAD || align=right | 1.3 km || 
|-id=637 bgcolor=#E9E9E9
| 387637 ||  || — || August 11, 2002 || Palomar || NEAT || — || align=right | 1.7 km || 
|-id=638 bgcolor=#E9E9E9
| 387638 ||  || — || August 15, 2002 || Palomar || NEAT || MIS || align=right | 2.1 km || 
|-id=639 bgcolor=#fefefe
| 387639 ||  || — || August 19, 2002 || Palomar || NEAT || — || align=right data-sort-value="0.96" | 960 m || 
|-id=640 bgcolor=#E9E9E9
| 387640 ||  || — || August 30, 2002 || Kitt Peak || Spacewatch || AST || align=right | 1.8 km || 
|-id=641 bgcolor=#E9E9E9
| 387641 ||  || — || August 30, 2002 || Palomar || NEAT || — || align=right | 1.8 km || 
|-id=642 bgcolor=#E9E9E9
| 387642 ||  || — || August 16, 2002 || Palomar || NEAT || PAD || align=right | 1.3 km || 
|-id=643 bgcolor=#E9E9E9
| 387643 ||  || — || August 18, 2002 || Palomar || NEAT || — || align=right | 2.0 km || 
|-id=644 bgcolor=#d6d6d6
| 387644 ||  || — || August 30, 2002 || Palomar || NEAT || CHA || align=right | 2.4 km || 
|-id=645 bgcolor=#E9E9E9
| 387645 ||  || — || August 30, 2002 || Palomar || NEAT || NEM || align=right | 2.8 km || 
|-id=646 bgcolor=#E9E9E9
| 387646 ||  || — || August 17, 2002 || Palomar || NEAT || — || align=right | 2.0 km || 
|-id=647 bgcolor=#E9E9E9
| 387647 ||  || — || August 28, 2002 || Palomar || NEAT || — || align=right | 2.6 km || 
|-id=648 bgcolor=#FFC2E0
| 387648 ||  || — || September 4, 2002 || Palomar || NEAT || AMOcritical || align=right data-sort-value="0.47" | 470 m || 
|-id=649 bgcolor=#fefefe
| 387649 ||  || — || September 4, 2002 || Anderson Mesa || LONEOS || — || align=right data-sort-value="0.83" | 830 m || 
|-id=650 bgcolor=#fefefe
| 387650 ||  || — || September 4, 2002 || Anderson Mesa || LONEOS || — || align=right data-sort-value="0.80" | 800 m || 
|-id=651 bgcolor=#fefefe
| 387651 ||  || — || September 5, 2002 || Anderson Mesa || LONEOS || H || align=right data-sort-value="0.82" | 820 m || 
|-id=652 bgcolor=#E9E9E9
| 387652 ||  || — || September 3, 2002 || Campo Imperatore || CINEOS || — || align=right | 1.9 km || 
|-id=653 bgcolor=#E9E9E9
| 387653 ||  || — || September 10, 2002 || Palomar || NEAT || — || align=right | 1.8 km || 
|-id=654 bgcolor=#d6d6d6
| 387654 ||  || — || September 11, 2002 || Palomar || NEAT || — || align=right | 2.4 km || 
|-id=655 bgcolor=#fefefe
| 387655 ||  || — || September 12, 2002 || Palomar || NEAT || — || align=right data-sort-value="0.79" | 790 m || 
|-id=656 bgcolor=#E9E9E9
| 387656 ||  || — || September 14, 2002 || Palomar || NEAT || DOR || align=right | 2.4 km || 
|-id=657 bgcolor=#fefefe
| 387657 ||  || — || September 14, 2002 || Palomar || NEAT || — || align=right data-sort-value="0.89" | 890 m || 
|-id=658 bgcolor=#E9E9E9
| 387658 ||  || — || September 15, 2002 || Palomar || NEAT || — || align=right | 2.4 km || 
|-id=659 bgcolor=#d6d6d6
| 387659 ||  || — || September 15, 2002 || Palomar || R. Matson || KOR || align=right | 1.6 km || 
|-id=660 bgcolor=#fefefe
| 387660 ||  || — || September 9, 2002 || Palomar || R. Matson || FLO || align=right data-sort-value="0.70" | 700 m || 
|-id=661 bgcolor=#fefefe
| 387661 ||  || — || September 10, 2002 || Haleakala || A. Lowe || H || align=right data-sort-value="0.73" | 730 m || 
|-id=662 bgcolor=#E9E9E9
| 387662 ||  || — || September 14, 2002 || Palomar || NEAT || WIT || align=right data-sort-value="0.93" | 930 m || 
|-id=663 bgcolor=#E9E9E9
| 387663 ||  || — || September 12, 2002 || Palomar || NEAT || — || align=right | 1.3 km || 
|-id=664 bgcolor=#fefefe
| 387664 ||  || — || September 13, 2002 || Palomar || NEAT || — || align=right data-sort-value="0.62" | 620 m || 
|-id=665 bgcolor=#E9E9E9
| 387665 ||  || — || September 14, 2002 || Palomar || NEAT || — || align=right | 1.9 km || 
|-id=666 bgcolor=#E9E9E9
| 387666 ||  || — || September 4, 2002 || Palomar || NEAT || — || align=right | 2.4 km || 
|-id=667 bgcolor=#fefefe
| 387667 ||  || — || September 15, 2002 || Palomar || NEAT || — || align=right data-sort-value="0.71" | 710 m || 
|-id=668 bgcolor=#FFC2E0
| 387668 ||  || — || September 26, 2002 || Palomar || NEAT || APOPHAcritical || align=right data-sort-value="0.30" | 300 m || 
|-id=669 bgcolor=#E9E9E9
| 387669 ||  || — || August 11, 2002 || Socorro || LINEAR || JUN || align=right | 1.2 km || 
|-id=670 bgcolor=#fefefe
| 387670 ||  || — || September 30, 2002 || Ondřejov || P. Pravec || — || align=right | 1.5 km || 
|-id=671 bgcolor=#d6d6d6
| 387671 ||  || — || September 28, 2002 || Haleakala || NEAT || HIL3:2 || align=right | 5.6 km || 
|-id=672 bgcolor=#E9E9E9
| 387672 ||  || — || September 28, 2002 || Haleakala || NEAT || AEO || align=right | 1.7 km || 
|-id=673 bgcolor=#E9E9E9
| 387673 ||  || — || September 29, 2002 || Haleakala || NEAT || POS || align=right | 5.3 km || 
|-id=674 bgcolor=#E9E9E9
| 387674 ||  || — || September 16, 2002 || Palomar || NEAT || NEM || align=right | 2.5 km || 
|-id=675 bgcolor=#fefefe
| 387675 ||  || — || October 1, 2002 || Anderson Mesa || LONEOS || — || align=right data-sort-value="0.80" | 800 m || 
|-id=676 bgcolor=#fefefe
| 387676 ||  || — || October 3, 2002 || Campo Imperatore || CINEOS || FLO || align=right data-sort-value="0.59" | 590 m || 
|-id=677 bgcolor=#E9E9E9
| 387677 ||  || — || October 3, 2002 || Socorro || LINEAR || — || align=right | 1.7 km || 
|-id=678 bgcolor=#fefefe
| 387678 ||  || — || October 3, 2002 || Socorro || LINEAR || FLO || align=right data-sort-value="0.69" | 690 m || 
|-id=679 bgcolor=#d6d6d6
| 387679 ||  || — || October 3, 2002 || Palomar || NEAT || — || align=right | 3.2 km || 
|-id=680 bgcolor=#fefefe
| 387680 ||  || — || October 4, 2002 || Palomar || NEAT || — || align=right data-sort-value="0.97" | 970 m || 
|-id=681 bgcolor=#d6d6d6
| 387681 ||  || — || October 4, 2002 || Socorro || LINEAR || — || align=right | 3.5 km || 
|-id=682 bgcolor=#fefefe
| 387682 ||  || — || October 5, 2002 || Palomar || NEAT || H || align=right data-sort-value="0.68" | 680 m || 
|-id=683 bgcolor=#fefefe
| 387683 ||  || — || October 12, 2002 || Socorro || LINEAR || H || align=right data-sort-value="0.71" | 710 m || 
|-id=684 bgcolor=#fefefe
| 387684 ||  || — || October 9, 2002 || Socorro || LINEAR || — || align=right data-sort-value="0.86" | 860 m || 
|-id=685 bgcolor=#E9E9E9
| 387685 ||  || — || October 4, 2002 || Apache Point || SDSS || — || align=right | 2.2 km || 
|-id=686 bgcolor=#E9E9E9
| 387686 ||  || — || October 4, 2002 || Apache Point || SDSS || — || align=right | 2.5 km || 
|-id=687 bgcolor=#d6d6d6
| 387687 ||  || — || October 4, 2002 || Apache Point || SDSS || — || align=right | 3.0 km || 
|-id=688 bgcolor=#fefefe
| 387688 ||  || — || October 5, 2002 || Apache Point || SDSS || — || align=right data-sort-value="0.65" | 650 m || 
|-id=689 bgcolor=#d6d6d6
| 387689 ||  || — || October 5, 2002 || Palomar || NEAT || — || align=right | 2.1 km || 
|-id=690 bgcolor=#fefefe
| 387690 ||  || — || October 18, 2002 || Palomar || NEAT || — || align=right data-sort-value="0.90" | 900 m || 
|-id=691 bgcolor=#fefefe
| 387691 ||  || — || October 28, 2002 || Nogales || C. W. Juels, P. R. Holvorcem || — || align=right data-sort-value="0.62" | 620 m || 
|-id=692 bgcolor=#fefefe
| 387692 ||  || — || October 30, 2002 || Palomar || NEAT || — || align=right data-sort-value="0.88" | 880 m || 
|-id=693 bgcolor=#fefefe
| 387693 ||  || — || October 30, 2002 || Palomar || NEAT || — || align=right | 1.7 km || 
|-id=694 bgcolor=#d6d6d6
| 387694 ||  || — || October 30, 2002 || Kitt Peak || Spacewatch || KAR || align=right | 1.2 km || 
|-id=695 bgcolor=#fefefe
| 387695 ||  || — || October 30, 2002 || Palomar || NEAT || FLO || align=right data-sort-value="0.64" | 640 m || 
|-id=696 bgcolor=#fefefe
| 387696 ||  || — || November 1, 2002 || Palomar || NEAT || — || align=right | 1.3 km || 
|-id=697 bgcolor=#fefefe
| 387697 ||  || — || November 6, 2002 || Socorro || LINEAR || — || align=right data-sort-value="0.75" | 750 m || 
|-id=698 bgcolor=#fefefe
| 387698 ||  || — || November 11, 2002 || Socorro || LINEAR || V || align=right data-sort-value="0.82" | 820 m || 
|-id=699 bgcolor=#fefefe
| 387699 ||  || — || November 13, 2002 || Socorro || LINEAR || H || align=right data-sort-value="0.86" | 860 m || 
|-id=700 bgcolor=#d6d6d6
| 387700 ||  || — || November 5, 2002 || Kitt Peak || Spacewatch || KAR || align=right | 1.4 km || 
|}

387701–387800 

|-bgcolor=#fefefe
| 387701 ||  || — || November 6, 2002 || Socorro || LINEAR || V || align=right data-sort-value="0.69" | 690 m || 
|-id=702 bgcolor=#fefefe
| 387702 ||  || — || November 24, 2002 || Palomar || NEAT || — || align=right | 1.4 km || 
|-id=703 bgcolor=#fefefe
| 387703 ||  || — || November 23, 2002 || Palomar || NEAT || FLO || align=right data-sort-value="0.73" | 730 m || 
|-id=704 bgcolor=#fefefe
| 387704 ||  || — || December 11, 2002 || Socorro || LINEAR || H || align=right data-sort-value="0.73" | 730 m || 
|-id=705 bgcolor=#fefefe
| 387705 ||  || — || December 10, 2002 || Palomar || NEAT || FLO || align=right data-sort-value="0.64" | 640 m || 
|-id=706 bgcolor=#fefefe
| 387706 ||  || — || December 31, 2002 || Socorro || LINEAR || — || align=right | 1.5 km || 
|-id=707 bgcolor=#fefefe
| 387707 ||  || — || January 5, 2003 || Socorro || LINEAR || H || align=right data-sort-value="0.83" | 830 m || 
|-id=708 bgcolor=#d6d6d6
| 387708 ||  || — || January 5, 2003 || Socorro || LINEAR || TIR || align=right | 2.7 km || 
|-id=709 bgcolor=#d6d6d6
| 387709 ||  || — || January 10, 2003 || Palomar || NEAT || — || align=right | 3.0 km || 
|-id=710 bgcolor=#d6d6d6
| 387710 ||  || — || January 26, 2003 || Kitt Peak || Spacewatch || EOS || align=right | 2.3 km || 
|-id=711 bgcolor=#fefefe
| 387711 ||  || — || January 27, 2003 || Palomar || NEAT || — || align=right | 1.0 km || 
|-id=712 bgcolor=#fefefe
| 387712 ||  || — || January 27, 2003 || Socorro || LINEAR || — || align=right | 1.1 km || 
|-id=713 bgcolor=#d6d6d6
| 387713 ||  || — || January 27, 2003 || Anderson Mesa || LONEOS || TIR || align=right | 3.5 km || 
|-id=714 bgcolor=#fefefe
| 387714 ||  || — || January 30, 2003 || Anderson Mesa || LONEOS || NYS || align=right data-sort-value="0.72" | 720 m || 
|-id=715 bgcolor=#d6d6d6
| 387715 ||  || — || January 26, 2003 || Anderson Mesa || LONEOS || — || align=right | 3.2 km || 
|-id=716 bgcolor=#fefefe
| 387716 ||  || — || February 6, 2003 || Kitt Peak || Spacewatch || NYS || align=right data-sort-value="0.79" | 790 m || 
|-id=717 bgcolor=#FFC2E0
| 387717 ||  || — || February 22, 2003 || Desert Eagle || W. K. Y. Yeung || APO || align=right data-sort-value="0.52" | 520 m || 
|-id=718 bgcolor=#fefefe
| 387718 ||  || — || February 21, 2003 || Palomar || NEAT || — || align=right data-sort-value="0.91" | 910 m || 
|-id=719 bgcolor=#d6d6d6
| 387719 ||  || — || February 22, 2003 || Palomar || NEAT || EUP || align=right | 5.0 km || 
|-id=720 bgcolor=#fefefe
| 387720 ||  || — || October 17, 1998 || Kitt Peak || Spacewatch || NYS || align=right data-sort-value="0.60" | 600 m || 
|-id=721 bgcolor=#d6d6d6
| 387721 ||  || — || January 27, 2003 || Socorro || LINEAR || — || align=right | 3.2 km || 
|-id=722 bgcolor=#d6d6d6
| 387722 ||  || — || March 5, 2003 || Socorro || LINEAR || — || align=right | 3.1 km || 
|-id=723 bgcolor=#d6d6d6
| 387723 ||  || — || March 6, 2003 || Anderson Mesa || LONEOS || — || align=right | 4.0 km || 
|-id=724 bgcolor=#fefefe
| 387724 ||  || — || March 30, 2003 || Socorro || LINEAR || H || align=right data-sort-value="0.76" | 760 m || 
|-id=725 bgcolor=#fefefe
| 387725 ||  || — || March 23, 2003 || Kitt Peak || Spacewatch || MAS || align=right data-sort-value="0.64" | 640 m || 
|-id=726 bgcolor=#d6d6d6
| 387726 ||  || — || March 25, 2003 || Palomar || NEAT || — || align=right | 3.2 km || 
|-id=727 bgcolor=#d6d6d6
| 387727 ||  || — || March 23, 2003 || Kitt Peak || Spacewatch || — || align=right | 3.5 km || 
|-id=728 bgcolor=#d6d6d6
| 387728 ||  || — || March 24, 2003 || Kitt Peak || Spacewatch || — || align=right | 3.3 km || 
|-id=729 bgcolor=#d6d6d6
| 387729 ||  || — || March 10, 2003 || Kitt Peak || Spacewatch || URS || align=right | 3.9 km || 
|-id=730 bgcolor=#d6d6d6
| 387730 ||  || — || March 31, 2003 || Wrightwood || J. W. Young || THM || align=right | 1.8 km || 
|-id=731 bgcolor=#fefefe
| 387731 ||  || — || March 27, 2003 || Palomar || NEAT || — || align=right | 1.2 km || 
|-id=732 bgcolor=#d6d6d6
| 387732 ||  || — || March 27, 2003 || Kitt Peak || Spacewatch || — || align=right | 3.2 km || 
|-id=733 bgcolor=#FFC2E0
| 387733 ||  || — || April 4, 2003 || Anderson Mesa || LONEOS || ATE || align=right data-sort-value="0.34" | 340 m || 
|-id=734 bgcolor=#d6d6d6
| 387734 ||  || — || April 1, 2003 || Socorro || LINEAR || — || align=right | 4.6 km || 
|-id=735 bgcolor=#fefefe
| 387735 ||  || — || March 31, 2003 || Catalina || CSS || — || align=right | 1.0 km || 
|-id=736 bgcolor=#fefefe
| 387736 ||  || — || April 1, 2003 || Kitt Peak || Spacewatch || NYS || align=right data-sort-value="0.55" | 550 m || 
|-id=737 bgcolor=#fefefe
| 387737 ||  || — || April 4, 2003 || Kitt Peak || Spacewatch || NYS || align=right data-sort-value="0.67" | 670 m || 
|-id=738 bgcolor=#fefefe
| 387738 ||  || — || April 4, 2003 || Kitt Peak || Spacewatch || — || align=right | 1.3 km || 
|-id=739 bgcolor=#d6d6d6
| 387739 ||  || — || April 4, 2003 || Kitt Peak || Spacewatch || — || align=right | 3.3 km || 
|-id=740 bgcolor=#fefefe
| 387740 ||  || — || April 11, 2003 || Kitt Peak || Spacewatch || V || align=right data-sort-value="0.67" | 670 m || 
|-id=741 bgcolor=#d6d6d6
| 387741 ||  || — || April 24, 2003 || Kitt Peak || Spacewatch || Tj (2.95) || align=right | 4.5 km || 
|-id=742 bgcolor=#d6d6d6
| 387742 ||  || — || April 24, 2003 || Anderson Mesa || LONEOS || — || align=right | 3.6 km || 
|-id=743 bgcolor=#fefefe
| 387743 ||  || — || April 27, 2003 || Anderson Mesa || LONEOS || — || align=right | 2.2 km || 
|-id=744 bgcolor=#fefefe
| 387744 ||  || — || April 26, 2003 || Campo Imperatore || CINEOS || — || align=right | 1.1 km || 
|-id=745 bgcolor=#fefefe
| 387745 ||  || — || May 1, 2003 || Kitt Peak || Spacewatch || — || align=right data-sort-value="0.92" | 920 m || 
|-id=746 bgcolor=#FFC2E0
| 387746 ||  || — || June 26, 2003 || Socorro || LINEAR || APOPHAcritical || align=right data-sort-value="0.37" | 370 m || 
|-id=747 bgcolor=#fefefe
| 387747 ||  || — || July 3, 2003 || Kitt Peak || Spacewatch || — || align=right | 1.0 km || 
|-id=748 bgcolor=#E9E9E9
| 387748 ||  || — || July 25, 2003 || Socorro || LINEAR || MAR || align=right | 1.5 km || 
|-id=749 bgcolor=#E9E9E9
| 387749 ||  || — || July 24, 2003 || Palomar || NEAT || — || align=right | 3.6 km || 
|-id=750 bgcolor=#E9E9E9
| 387750 ||  || — || August 22, 2003 || Haleakala || NEAT || — || align=right | 2.1 km || 
|-id=751 bgcolor=#E9E9E9
| 387751 ||  || — || August 23, 2003 || Socorro || LINEAR || — || align=right | 1.5 km || 
|-id=752 bgcolor=#E9E9E9
| 387752 ||  || — || September 16, 2003 || Palomar || NEAT || AER || align=right | 1.8 km || 
|-id=753 bgcolor=#E9E9E9
| 387753 ||  || — || September 17, 2003 || Palomar || NEAT || — || align=right | 2.9 km || 
|-id=754 bgcolor=#E9E9E9
| 387754 ||  || — || September 16, 2003 || Palomar || NEAT || — || align=right | 2.1 km || 
|-id=755 bgcolor=#E9E9E9
| 387755 ||  || — || September 16, 2003 || Anderson Mesa || LONEOS || — || align=right | 2.2 km || 
|-id=756 bgcolor=#E9E9E9
| 387756 ||  || — || September 17, 2003 || Anderson Mesa || LONEOS || — || align=right | 2.5 km || 
|-id=757 bgcolor=#E9E9E9
| 387757 ||  || — || September 17, 2003 || Kitt Peak || Spacewatch || — || align=right | 1.5 km || 
|-id=758 bgcolor=#E9E9E9
| 387758 ||  || — || September 18, 2003 || Kitt Peak || Spacewatch || NEM || align=right | 1.8 km || 
|-id=759 bgcolor=#E9E9E9
| 387759 ||  || — || September 19, 2003 || Palomar || NEAT || — || align=right | 2.2 km || 
|-id=760 bgcolor=#E9E9E9
| 387760 ||  || — || September 19, 2003 || Mount Graham || VATT || — || align=right | 1.3 km || 
|-id=761 bgcolor=#E9E9E9
| 387761 ||  || — || September 19, 2003 || Palomar || NEAT || — || align=right | 1.9 km || 
|-id=762 bgcolor=#E9E9E9
| 387762 ||  || — || September 18, 2003 || Palomar || NEAT || — || align=right | 1.6 km || 
|-id=763 bgcolor=#E9E9E9
| 387763 ||  || — || September 20, 2003 || Haleakala || NEAT || — || align=right | 1.2 km || 
|-id=764 bgcolor=#E9E9E9
| 387764 ||  || — || September 27, 2003 || Kitt Peak || Spacewatch || — || align=right | 2.2 km || 
|-id=765 bgcolor=#E9E9E9
| 387765 ||  || — || September 21, 2003 || Kitt Peak || Spacewatch || — || align=right data-sort-value="0.95" | 950 m || 
|-id=766 bgcolor=#E9E9E9
| 387766 ||  || — || September 22, 2003 || Anderson Mesa || LONEOS || — || align=right | 1.8 km || 
|-id=767 bgcolor=#E9E9E9
| 387767 ||  || — || September 26, 2003 || Apache Point || SDSS || MAR || align=right | 1.3 km || 
|-id=768 bgcolor=#E9E9E9
| 387768 ||  || — || September 26, 2003 || Apache Point || SDSS || — || align=right | 2.0 km || 
|-id=769 bgcolor=#E9E9E9
| 387769 ||  || — || September 26, 2003 || Apache Point || SDSS || — || align=right | 1.2 km || 
|-id=770 bgcolor=#E9E9E9
| 387770 ||  || — || September 22, 2003 || Kitt Peak || Spacewatch || — || align=right | 2.1 km || 
|-id=771 bgcolor=#E9E9E9
| 387771 ||  || — || October 1, 2003 || Kitt Peak || Spacewatch || — || align=right | 1.5 km || 
|-id=772 bgcolor=#E9E9E9
| 387772 ||  || — || September 20, 2003 || Kitt Peak || Spacewatch || WIT || align=right data-sort-value="0.90" | 900 m || 
|-id=773 bgcolor=#E9E9E9
| 387773 ||  || — || September 29, 2003 || Anderson Mesa || LONEOS || — || align=right | 3.0 km || 
|-id=774 bgcolor=#E9E9E9
| 387774 ||  || — || October 5, 2003 || Haleakala || NEAT || — || align=right | 2.4 km || 
|-id=775 bgcolor=#E9E9E9
| 387775 ||  || — || October 17, 2003 || Kitt Peak || Spacewatch || — || align=right | 1.5 km || 
|-id=776 bgcolor=#E9E9E9
| 387776 ||  || — || October 24, 2003 || Socorro || LINEAR || — || align=right | 1.5 km || 
|-id=777 bgcolor=#E9E9E9
| 387777 ||  || — || October 18, 2003 || Kitt Peak || Spacewatch || — || align=right | 1.9 km || 
|-id=778 bgcolor=#E9E9E9
| 387778 ||  || — || October 18, 2003 || Palomar || NEAT || — || align=right | 2.1 km || 
|-id=779 bgcolor=#E9E9E9
| 387779 ||  || — || October 20, 2003 || Socorro || LINEAR || DOR || align=right | 2.7 km || 
|-id=780 bgcolor=#E9E9E9
| 387780 ||  || — || October 18, 2003 || Kitt Peak || Spacewatch || — || align=right | 1.8 km || 
|-id=781 bgcolor=#E9E9E9
| 387781 ||  || — || September 21, 2003 || Kitt Peak || Spacewatch || — || align=right | 1.8 km || 
|-id=782 bgcolor=#E9E9E9
| 387782 ||  || — || October 21, 2003 || Palomar || NEAT || — || align=right | 2.7 km || 
|-id=783 bgcolor=#E9E9E9
| 387783 ||  || — || October 25, 2003 || Socorro || LINEAR || — || align=right | 1.7 km || 
|-id=784 bgcolor=#E9E9E9
| 387784 ||  || — || October 16, 2003 || Kitt Peak || Spacewatch || — || align=right | 1.0 km || 
|-id=785 bgcolor=#E9E9E9
| 387785 ||  || — || September 28, 2003 || Anderson Mesa || LONEOS || — || align=right | 2.1 km || 
|-id=786 bgcolor=#E9E9E9
| 387786 ||  || — || September 28, 2003 || Kitt Peak || Spacewatch || — || align=right | 1.9 km || 
|-id=787 bgcolor=#E9E9E9
| 387787 ||  || — || October 23, 2003 || Kitt Peak || M. W. Buie || — || align=right | 2.4 km || 
|-id=788 bgcolor=#E9E9E9
| 387788 ||  || — || October 19, 2003 || Apache Point || SDSS || — || align=right | 1.4 km || 
|-id=789 bgcolor=#E9E9E9
| 387789 ||  || — || October 19, 2003 || Apache Point || SDSS || — || align=right | 2.1 km || 
|-id=790 bgcolor=#E9E9E9
| 387790 ||  || — || September 28, 2003 || Anderson Mesa || LONEOS || — || align=right | 1.9 km || 
|-id=791 bgcolor=#E9E9E9
| 387791 ||  || — || September 18, 2003 || Kitt Peak || Spacewatch || ADE || align=right | 1.9 km || 
|-id=792 bgcolor=#E9E9E9
| 387792 ||  || — || October 19, 2003 || Kitt Peak || Spacewatch || AGN || align=right | 1.2 km || 
|-id=793 bgcolor=#FFC2E0
| 387793 ||  || — || November 20, 2003 || Socorro || LINEAR || APO +1km || align=right | 1.8 km || 
|-id=794 bgcolor=#E9E9E9
| 387794 ||  || — || November 19, 2003 || Anderson Mesa || LONEOS || DOR || align=right | 2.1 km || 
|-id=795 bgcolor=#E9E9E9
| 387795 ||  || — || October 20, 2003 || Kitt Peak || Spacewatch || — || align=right | 2.6 km || 
|-id=796 bgcolor=#E9E9E9
| 387796 ||  || — || November 21, 2003 || Palomar || NEAT || — || align=right | 1.5 km || 
|-id=797 bgcolor=#d6d6d6
| 387797 ||  || — || November 21, 2003 || Kitt Peak || Spacewatch || CHA || align=right | 2.6 km || 
|-id=798 bgcolor=#E9E9E9
| 387798 ||  || — || November 19, 2003 || Kitt Peak || Spacewatch || — || align=right | 2.7 km || 
|-id=799 bgcolor=#E9E9E9
| 387799 ||  || — || December 17, 2003 || Socorro || LINEAR || — || align=right | 3.8 km || 
|-id=800 bgcolor=#E9E9E9
| 387800 ||  || — || December 19, 2003 || Kitt Peak || Spacewatch || AGN || align=right | 1.2 km || 
|}

387801–387900 

|-bgcolor=#d6d6d6
| 387801 ||  || — || January 23, 2004 || Socorro || LINEAR || TIR || align=right | 3.3 km || 
|-id=802 bgcolor=#E9E9E9
| 387802 ||  || — || January 16, 2004 || Kitt Peak || Spacewatch || — || align=right | 2.3 km || 
|-id=803 bgcolor=#d6d6d6
| 387803 ||  || — || February 11, 2004 || Kitt Peak || Spacewatch || — || align=right | 2.7 km || 
|-id=804 bgcolor=#fefefe
| 387804 ||  || — || February 11, 2004 || Kitt Peak || Spacewatch || — || align=right data-sort-value="0.51" | 510 m || 
|-id=805 bgcolor=#fefefe
| 387805 ||  || — || February 23, 2004 || Socorro || LINEAR || — || align=right data-sort-value="0.85" | 850 m || 
|-id=806 bgcolor=#d6d6d6
| 387806 ||  || — || February 22, 2004 || Kitt Peak || M. W. Buie || DUR || align=right | 2.9 km || 
|-id=807 bgcolor=#d6d6d6
| 387807 ||  || — || March 14, 2004 || Socorro || LINEAR || — || align=right | 4.4 km || 
|-id=808 bgcolor=#fefefe
| 387808 ||  || — || March 15, 2004 || Desert Eagle || W. K. Y. Yeung || — || align=right data-sort-value="0.87" | 870 m || 
|-id=809 bgcolor=#fefefe
| 387809 ||  || — || February 16, 2004 || Kitt Peak || Spacewatch || FLO || align=right data-sort-value="0.80" | 800 m || 
|-id=810 bgcolor=#fefefe
| 387810 ||  || — || March 12, 2004 || Palomar || NEAT || — || align=right data-sort-value="0.94" | 940 m || 
|-id=811 bgcolor=#d6d6d6
| 387811 ||  || — || March 15, 2004 || Socorro || LINEAR || — || align=right | 3.6 km || 
|-id=812 bgcolor=#d6d6d6
| 387812 ||  || — || March 15, 2004 || Kitt Peak || Spacewatch || EOS || align=right | 1.8 km || 
|-id=813 bgcolor=#fefefe
| 387813 ||  || — || January 27, 2004 || Kitt Peak || Spacewatch || FLO || align=right data-sort-value="0.56" | 560 m || 
|-id=814 bgcolor=#FA8072
| 387814 ||  || — || March 16, 2004 || Socorro || LINEAR || — || align=right | 1.5 km || 
|-id=815 bgcolor=#fefefe
| 387815 ||  || — || March 19, 2004 || Palomar || NEAT || — || align=right | 1.0 km || 
|-id=816 bgcolor=#FFC2E0
| 387816 ||  || — || March 26, 2004 || Socorro || LINEAR || ATE || align=right data-sort-value="0.47" | 470 m || 
|-id=817 bgcolor=#d6d6d6
| 387817 ||  || — || March 16, 2004 || Siding Spring || SSS || — || align=right | 4.7 km || 
|-id=818 bgcolor=#fefefe
| 387818 ||  || — || March 17, 2004 || Kitt Peak || Spacewatch || FLO || align=right data-sort-value="0.67" | 670 m || 
|-id=819 bgcolor=#d6d6d6
| 387819 ||  || — || March 16, 2004 || Kitt Peak || Spacewatch || THM || align=right | 2.0 km || 
|-id=820 bgcolor=#fefefe
| 387820 ||  || — || March 18, 2004 || Socorro || LINEAR || — || align=right data-sort-value="0.71" | 710 m || 
|-id=821 bgcolor=#d6d6d6
| 387821 ||  || — || March 18, 2004 || Catalina || CSS || — || align=right | 3.9 km || 
|-id=822 bgcolor=#d6d6d6
| 387822 ||  || — || March 23, 2004 || Kitt Peak || Spacewatch || — || align=right | 2.5 km || 
|-id=823 bgcolor=#d6d6d6
| 387823 ||  || — || April 12, 2004 || Anderson Mesa || LONEOS || — || align=right | 4.1 km || 
|-id=824 bgcolor=#fefefe
| 387824 ||  || — || April 13, 2004 || Catalina || CSS || — || align=right | 1.0 km || 
|-id=825 bgcolor=#d6d6d6
| 387825 ||  || — || April 10, 2004 || Palomar || NEAT || — || align=right | 3.6 km || 
|-id=826 bgcolor=#FA8072
| 387826 ||  || — || April 15, 2004 || Palomar || NEAT || — || align=right data-sort-value="0.86" | 860 m || 
|-id=827 bgcolor=#fefefe
| 387827 ||  || — || April 12, 2004 || Palomar || NEAT || H || align=right data-sort-value="0.74" | 740 m || 
|-id=828 bgcolor=#fefefe
| 387828 ||  || — || April 12, 2004 || Kitt Peak || Spacewatch || — || align=right data-sort-value="0.78" | 780 m || 
|-id=829 bgcolor=#fefefe
| 387829 ||  || — || April 12, 2004 || Kitt Peak || Spacewatch || — || align=right data-sort-value="0.86" | 860 m || 
|-id=830 bgcolor=#d6d6d6
| 387830 ||  || — || April 14, 2004 || Kitt Peak || Spacewatch || — || align=right | 3.0 km || 
|-id=831 bgcolor=#fefefe
| 387831 ||  || — || April 16, 2004 || Socorro || LINEAR || — || align=right data-sort-value="0.79" | 790 m || 
|-id=832 bgcolor=#fefefe
| 387832 ||  || — || April 19, 2004 || Socorro || LINEAR || FLO || align=right data-sort-value="0.77" | 770 m || 
|-id=833 bgcolor=#d6d6d6
| 387833 ||  || — || April 16, 2004 || Kitt Peak || Spacewatch || — || align=right | 2.9 km || 
|-id=834 bgcolor=#fefefe
| 387834 ||  || — || April 16, 2004 || Socorro || LINEAR || H || align=right | 1.1 km || 
|-id=835 bgcolor=#d6d6d6
| 387835 ||  || — || April 25, 2004 || Kitt Peak || Spacewatch || — || align=right | 3.0 km || 
|-id=836 bgcolor=#fefefe
| 387836 ||  || — || April 20, 2004 || Catalina || CSS || — || align=right | 1.5 km || 
|-id=837 bgcolor=#fefefe
| 387837 ||  || — || May 9, 2004 || Kitt Peak || Spacewatch || NYS || align=right data-sort-value="0.64" | 640 m || 
|-id=838 bgcolor=#fefefe
| 387838 ||  || — || April 30, 2004 || Kitt Peak || Spacewatch || — || align=right | 1.0 km || 
|-id=839 bgcolor=#fefefe
| 387839 ||  || — || May 20, 2004 || Kitt Peak || Spacewatch || — || align=right data-sort-value="0.84" | 840 m || 
|-id=840 bgcolor=#d6d6d6
| 387840 ||  || — || May 22, 2004 || Catalina || CSS || — || align=right | 3.3 km || 
|-id=841 bgcolor=#FA8072
| 387841 ||  || — || June 8, 2004 || Socorro || LINEAR || H || align=right data-sort-value="0.90" | 900 m || 
|-id=842 bgcolor=#d6d6d6
| 387842 ||  || — || June 12, 2004 || Socorro || LINEAR || — || align=right | 3.7 km || 
|-id=843 bgcolor=#fefefe
| 387843 ||  || — || July 6, 2004 || Campo Imperatore || CINEOS || — || align=right data-sort-value="0.87" | 870 m || 
|-id=844 bgcolor=#fefefe
| 387844 ||  || — || July 14, 2004 || Socorro || LINEAR || — || align=right | 1.0 km || 
|-id=845 bgcolor=#FA8072
| 387845 ||  || — || July 15, 2004 || Socorro || LINEAR || — || align=right | 1.1 km || 
|-id=846 bgcolor=#fefefe
| 387846 ||  || — || July 16, 2004 || Socorro || LINEAR || — || align=right data-sort-value="0.88" | 880 m || 
|-id=847 bgcolor=#fefefe
| 387847 ||  || — || July 17, 2004 || Socorro || LINEAR || NYS || align=right data-sort-value="0.80" | 800 m || 
|-id=848 bgcolor=#FA8072
| 387848 ||  || — || July 22, 2004 || Siding Spring || SSS || — || align=right | 1.5 km || 
|-id=849 bgcolor=#fefefe
| 387849 ||  || — || August 6, 2004 || Reedy Creek || J. Broughton || NYS || align=right data-sort-value="0.77" | 770 m || 
|-id=850 bgcolor=#E9E9E9
| 387850 ||  || — || August 7, 2004 || Palomar || NEAT || EUN || align=right | 1.4 km || 
|-id=851 bgcolor=#fefefe
| 387851 ||  || — || August 6, 2004 || Palomar || NEAT || — || align=right | 1.6 km || 
|-id=852 bgcolor=#fefefe
| 387852 ||  || — || August 8, 2004 || Anderson Mesa || LONEOS || — || align=right data-sort-value="0.73" | 730 m || 
|-id=853 bgcolor=#fefefe
| 387853 ||  || — || August 9, 2004 || Socorro || LINEAR || — || align=right data-sort-value="0.94" | 940 m || 
|-id=854 bgcolor=#fefefe
| 387854 ||  || — || August 9, 2004 || Anderson Mesa || LONEOS || NYS || align=right data-sort-value="0.66" | 660 m || 
|-id=855 bgcolor=#fefefe
| 387855 ||  || — || August 9, 2004 || Socorro || LINEAR || — || align=right | 1.3 km || 
|-id=856 bgcolor=#fefefe
| 387856 ||  || — || August 14, 2004 || Reedy Creek || J. Broughton || — || align=right data-sort-value="0.90" | 900 m || 
|-id=857 bgcolor=#d6d6d6
| 387857 ||  || — || August 21, 2004 || Siding Spring || SSS || — || align=right | 3.7 km || 
|-id=858 bgcolor=#fefefe
| 387858 ||  || — || August 24, 2004 || Socorro || LINEAR || PHO || align=right | 1.2 km || 
|-id=859 bgcolor=#E9E9E9
| 387859 ||  || — || August 23, 2004 || Mayhill || R. Hutsebaut || — || align=right | 1.9 km || 
|-id=860 bgcolor=#fefefe
| 387860 ||  || — || September 4, 2004 || Palomar || NEAT || — || align=right | 1.0 km || 
|-id=861 bgcolor=#fefefe
| 387861 ||  || — || September 8, 2004 || Socorro || LINEAR || H || align=right data-sort-value="0.86" | 860 m || 
|-id=862 bgcolor=#fefefe
| 387862 ||  || — || September 8, 2004 || Socorro || LINEAR || NYS || align=right data-sort-value="0.89" | 890 m || 
|-id=863 bgcolor=#E9E9E9
| 387863 ||  || — || August 19, 2004 || Siding Spring || SSS || JUN || align=right | 1.2 km || 
|-id=864 bgcolor=#fefefe
| 387864 ||  || — || September 9, 2004 || Socorro || LINEAR || V || align=right data-sort-value="0.87" | 870 m || 
|-id=865 bgcolor=#d6d6d6
| 387865 ||  || — || September 8, 2004 || Socorro || LINEAR || EUP || align=right | 4.5 km || 
|-id=866 bgcolor=#d6d6d6
| 387866 ||  || — || September 8, 2004 || Palomar || NEAT || — || align=right | 3.1 km || 
|-id=867 bgcolor=#fefefe
| 387867 ||  || — || September 7, 2004 || Kitt Peak || Spacewatch || — || align=right data-sort-value="0.77" | 770 m || 
|-id=868 bgcolor=#fefefe
| 387868 ||  || — || September 6, 2004 || Siding Spring || SSS || NYS || align=right data-sort-value="0.62" | 620 m || 
|-id=869 bgcolor=#fefefe
| 387869 ||  || — || September 10, 2004 || Socorro || LINEAR || — || align=right | 1.1 km || 
|-id=870 bgcolor=#E9E9E9
| 387870 ||  || — || September 10, 2004 || Socorro || LINEAR || — || align=right | 1.9 km || 
|-id=871 bgcolor=#FFC2E0
| 387871 ||  || — || September 15, 2004 || Socorro || LINEAR || APO || align=right data-sort-value="0.54" | 540 m || 
|-id=872 bgcolor=#fefefe
| 387872 ||  || — || September 13, 2004 || Kitt Peak || Spacewatch || NYS || align=right data-sort-value="0.71" | 710 m || 
|-id=873 bgcolor=#E9E9E9
| 387873 ||  || — || September 13, 2004 || Socorro || LINEAR || — || align=right | 1.0 km || 
|-id=874 bgcolor=#E9E9E9
| 387874 ||  || — || September 13, 2004 || Socorro || LINEAR || — || align=right | 1.7 km || 
|-id=875 bgcolor=#fefefe
| 387875 ||  || — || September 15, 2004 || Socorro || LINEAR || H || align=right data-sort-value="0.78" | 780 m || 
|-id=876 bgcolor=#E9E9E9
| 387876 ||  || — || September 15, 2004 || Kitt Peak || Spacewatch || — || align=right | 1.5 km || 
|-id=877 bgcolor=#fefefe
| 387877 ||  || — || September 15, 2004 || Kitt Peak || Spacewatch || NYS || align=right data-sort-value="0.73" | 730 m || 
|-id=878 bgcolor=#E9E9E9
| 387878 ||  || — || September 14, 2004 || Socorro || LINEAR || JUN || align=right data-sort-value="0.79" | 790 m || 
|-id=879 bgcolor=#fefefe
| 387879 ||  || — || September 16, 2004 || Siding Spring || SSS || — || align=right | 1.1 km || 
|-id=880 bgcolor=#fefefe
| 387880 ||  || — || October 4, 2004 || Kitt Peak || Spacewatch || V || align=right data-sort-value="0.87" | 870 m || 
|-id=881 bgcolor=#fefefe
| 387881 ||  || — || October 5, 2004 || Socorro || LINEAR || — || align=right | 1.1 km || 
|-id=882 bgcolor=#fefefe
| 387882 ||  || — || October 9, 2004 || Socorro || LINEAR || H || align=right data-sort-value="0.68" | 680 m || 
|-id=883 bgcolor=#E9E9E9
| 387883 ||  || — || October 8, 2004 || Kitt Peak || Spacewatch || — || align=right | 1.1 km || 
|-id=884 bgcolor=#E9E9E9
| 387884 ||  || — || October 4, 2004 || Kitt Peak || Spacewatch || — || align=right data-sort-value="0.82" | 820 m || 
|-id=885 bgcolor=#E9E9E9
| 387885 ||  || — || October 5, 2004 || Anderson Mesa || LONEOS || — || align=right | 1.8 km || 
|-id=886 bgcolor=#fefefe
| 387886 ||  || — || October 5, 2004 || Anderson Mesa || LONEOS || — || align=right data-sort-value="0.91" | 910 m || 
|-id=887 bgcolor=#E9E9E9
| 387887 ||  || — || October 5, 2004 || Kitt Peak || Spacewatch || — || align=right data-sort-value="0.83" | 830 m || 
|-id=888 bgcolor=#E9E9E9
| 387888 ||  || — || October 5, 2004 || Kitt Peak || Spacewatch || — || align=right data-sort-value="0.89" | 890 m || 
|-id=889 bgcolor=#fefefe
| 387889 ||  || — || October 7, 2004 || Kitt Peak || Spacewatch || MAS || align=right data-sort-value="0.75" | 750 m || 
|-id=890 bgcolor=#E9E9E9
| 387890 ||  || — || October 4, 2004 || Kitt Peak || Spacewatch || — || align=right data-sort-value="0.91" | 910 m || 
|-id=891 bgcolor=#fefefe
| 387891 ||  || — || October 7, 2004 || Socorro || LINEAR || — || align=right | 1.2 km || 
|-id=892 bgcolor=#fefefe
| 387892 ||  || — || October 6, 2004 || Kitt Peak || Spacewatch || NYS || align=right data-sort-value="0.66" | 660 m || 
|-id=893 bgcolor=#fefefe
| 387893 ||  || — || October 7, 2004 || Kitt Peak || Spacewatch || MAS || align=right data-sort-value="0.81" | 810 m || 
|-id=894 bgcolor=#E9E9E9
| 387894 ||  || — || October 7, 2004 || Kitt Peak || Spacewatch || — || align=right data-sort-value="0.70" | 700 m || 
|-id=895 bgcolor=#fefefe
| 387895 ||  || — || October 7, 2004 || Kitt Peak || Spacewatch || NYS || align=right data-sort-value="0.91" | 910 m || 
|-id=896 bgcolor=#fefefe
| 387896 ||  || — || October 7, 2004 || Kitt Peak || Spacewatch || NYS || align=right data-sort-value="0.74" | 740 m || 
|-id=897 bgcolor=#E9E9E9
| 387897 ||  || — || October 9, 2004 || Kitt Peak || Spacewatch || — || align=right | 1.5 km || 
|-id=898 bgcolor=#E9E9E9
| 387898 ||  || — || October 10, 2004 || Kitt Peak || Spacewatch || — || align=right data-sort-value="0.96" | 960 m || 
|-id=899 bgcolor=#E9E9E9
| 387899 ||  || — || November 9, 2004 || Catalina || CSS || — || align=right | 1.1 km || 
|-id=900 bgcolor=#E9E9E9
| 387900 ||  || — || November 12, 2004 || Catalina || CSS || — || align=right data-sort-value="0.92" | 920 m || 
|}

387901–388000 

|-bgcolor=#d6d6d6
| 387901 ||  || — || November 3, 2004 || Kitt Peak || Spacewatch || 3:2 || align=right | 4.9 km || 
|-id=902 bgcolor=#E9E9E9
| 387902 ||  || — || November 10, 2004 || Kitt Peak || Spacewatch || — || align=right data-sort-value="0.65" | 650 m || 
|-id=903 bgcolor=#E9E9E9
| 387903 ||  || — || November 11, 2004 || Kitt Peak || Spacewatch || — || align=right data-sort-value="0.91" | 910 m || 
|-id=904 bgcolor=#E9E9E9
| 387904 ||  || — || November 10, 2004 || Kitt Peak || Spacewatch || — || align=right | 1.0 km || 
|-id=905 bgcolor=#E9E9E9
| 387905 ||  || — || November 17, 2004 || Campo Imperatore || CINEOS || MAR || align=right | 1.3 km || 
|-id=906 bgcolor=#E9E9E9
| 387906 ||  || — || December 1, 2004 || Palomar || NEAT || EUN || align=right | 1.9 km || 
|-id=907 bgcolor=#E9E9E9
| 387907 ||  || — || December 10, 2004 || Kitt Peak || Spacewatch || — || align=right | 1.5 km || 
|-id=908 bgcolor=#E9E9E9
| 387908 ||  || — || December 11, 2004 || Socorro || LINEAR || — || align=right | 2.7 km || 
|-id=909 bgcolor=#E9E9E9
| 387909 ||  || — || December 12, 2004 || Campo Imperatore || CINEOS || — || align=right | 1.3 km || 
|-id=910 bgcolor=#E9E9E9
| 387910 ||  || — || December 10, 2004 || Kitt Peak || Spacewatch || NEM || align=right | 2.6 km || 
|-id=911 bgcolor=#E9E9E9
| 387911 ||  || — || December 12, 2004 || Kitt Peak || Spacewatch || — || align=right | 1.6 km || 
|-id=912 bgcolor=#E9E9E9
| 387912 ||  || — || December 11, 2004 || Socorro || LINEAR || — || align=right | 1.5 km || 
|-id=913 bgcolor=#E9E9E9
| 387913 ||  || — || December 2, 2004 || Anderson Mesa || LONEOS || — || align=right | 2.8 km || 
|-id=914 bgcolor=#E9E9E9
| 387914 ||  || — || December 14, 2004 || Socorro || LINEAR || — || align=right | 1.1 km || 
|-id=915 bgcolor=#E9E9E9
| 387915 ||  || — || December 15, 2004 || Socorro || LINEAR || IAN || align=right | 1.1 km || 
|-id=916 bgcolor=#E9E9E9
| 387916 ||  || — || December 18, 2004 || Mount Lemmon || Mount Lemmon Survey || — || align=right | 1.3 km || 
|-id=917 bgcolor=#E9E9E9
| 387917 ||  || — || December 18, 2004 || Mount Lemmon || Mount Lemmon Survey || IAN || align=right data-sort-value="0.89" | 890 m || 
|-id=918 bgcolor=#E9E9E9
| 387918 ||  || — || December 20, 2004 || Mount Lemmon || Mount Lemmon Survey || — || align=right | 2.6 km || 
|-id=919 bgcolor=#E9E9E9
| 387919 ||  || — || December 31, 2004 || Junk Bond || Junk Bond Obs. || — || align=right | 1.5 km || 
|-id=920 bgcolor=#E9E9E9
| 387920 ||  || — || December 18, 2004 || Socorro || LINEAR || — || align=right | 2.6 km || 
|-id=921 bgcolor=#E9E9E9
| 387921 ||  || — || January 13, 2005 || Catalina || CSS || — || align=right | 1.9 km || 
|-id=922 bgcolor=#E9E9E9
| 387922 ||  || — || January 15, 2005 || Socorro || LINEAR || — || align=right | 1.8 km || 
|-id=923 bgcolor=#E9E9E9
| 387923 ||  || — || January 16, 2005 || Socorro || LINEAR || MAR || align=right | 1.6 km || 
|-id=924 bgcolor=#E9E9E9
| 387924 ||  || — || January 16, 2005 || Kitt Peak || Spacewatch || — || align=right | 2.0 km || 
|-id=925 bgcolor=#E9E9E9
| 387925 ||  || — || January 17, 2005 || Socorro || LINEAR || — || align=right | 3.0 km || 
|-id=926 bgcolor=#E9E9E9
| 387926 ||  || — || February 1, 2005 || Catalina || CSS || JUN || align=right | 1.1 km || 
|-id=927 bgcolor=#E9E9E9
| 387927 ||  || — || February 1, 2005 || Kitt Peak || Spacewatch || — || align=right | 1.8 km || 
|-id=928 bgcolor=#E9E9E9
| 387928 ||  || — || February 2, 2005 || Catalina || CSS || — || align=right | 2.1 km || 
|-id=929 bgcolor=#E9E9E9
| 387929 ||  || — || February 1, 2005 || Kitt Peak || Spacewatch || — || align=right | 2.0 km || 
|-id=930 bgcolor=#E9E9E9
| 387930 ||  || — || February 1, 2005 || Kitt Peak || Spacewatch || WIT || align=right data-sort-value="0.84" | 840 m || 
|-id=931 bgcolor=#E9E9E9
| 387931 ||  || — || February 1, 2005 || Kitt Peak || Spacewatch || — || align=right | 2.6 km || 
|-id=932 bgcolor=#E9E9E9
| 387932 ||  || — || February 2, 2005 || Kitt Peak || Spacewatch || — || align=right | 1.6 km || 
|-id=933 bgcolor=#E9E9E9
| 387933 ||  || — || January 13, 2005 || Kitt Peak || Spacewatch || — || align=right | 1.9 km || 
|-id=934 bgcolor=#E9E9E9
| 387934 ||  || — || February 6, 2005 || Gnosca || S. Sposetti || JUN || align=right | 1.1 km || 
|-id=935 bgcolor=#E9E9E9
| 387935 ||  || — || February 1, 2005 || Kitt Peak || Spacewatch || — || align=right | 1.8 km || 
|-id=936 bgcolor=#E9E9E9
| 387936 ||  || — || March 1, 2005 || Kitt Peak || Spacewatch || — || align=right | 2.5 km || 
|-id=937 bgcolor=#E9E9E9
| 387937 ||  || — || March 3, 2005 || Kitt Peak || Spacewatch || — || align=right | 1.9 km || 
|-id=938 bgcolor=#E9E9E9
| 387938 ||  || — || March 3, 2005 || Kitt Peak || Spacewatch || — || align=right | 2.3 km || 
|-id=939 bgcolor=#E9E9E9
| 387939 ||  || — || March 3, 2005 || Kitt Peak || Spacewatch || ADE || align=right | 2.2 km || 
|-id=940 bgcolor=#E9E9E9
| 387940 ||  || — || March 4, 2005 || Kitt Peak || Spacewatch || — || align=right | 2.5 km || 
|-id=941 bgcolor=#E9E9E9
| 387941 ||  || — || March 4, 2005 || Catalina || CSS || — || align=right | 2.9 km || 
|-id=942 bgcolor=#E9E9E9
| 387942 ||  || — || January 18, 2005 || Catalina || CSS || — || align=right | 3.2 km || 
|-id=943 bgcolor=#E9E9E9
| 387943 ||  || — || March 9, 2005 || Socorro || LINEAR || — || align=right | 2.7 km || 
|-id=944 bgcolor=#E9E9E9
| 387944 ||  || — || March 10, 2005 || Mount Lemmon || Mount Lemmon Survey || — || align=right | 1.9 km || 
|-id=945 bgcolor=#E9E9E9
| 387945 ||  || — || March 10, 2005 || Kitt Peak || Spacewatch || — || align=right | 2.5 km || 
|-id=946 bgcolor=#E9E9E9
| 387946 ||  || — || March 8, 2005 || Anderson Mesa || LONEOS || — || align=right | 2.7 km || 
|-id=947 bgcolor=#E9E9E9
| 387947 ||  || — || March 9, 2005 || Kitt Peak || Spacewatch || — || align=right | 2.1 km || 
|-id=948 bgcolor=#E9E9E9
| 387948 ||  || — || March 9, 2005 || Catalina || CSS || — || align=right | 2.4 km || 
|-id=949 bgcolor=#E9E9E9
| 387949 ||  || — || March 10, 2005 || Mount Lemmon || Mount Lemmon Survey || MRX || align=right | 1.0 km || 
|-id=950 bgcolor=#d6d6d6
| 387950 ||  || — || March 3, 2005 || Kitt Peak || Spacewatch || KOR || align=right | 1.5 km || 
|-id=951 bgcolor=#d6d6d6
| 387951 ||  || — || March 11, 2005 || Kitt Peak || Spacewatch || KOR || align=right | 1.5 km || 
|-id=952 bgcolor=#E9E9E9
| 387952 ||  || — || March 11, 2005 || Catalina || CSS || — || align=right | 2.5 km || 
|-id=953 bgcolor=#E9E9E9
| 387953 ||  || — || March 1, 2005 || Kitt Peak || Spacewatch || — || align=right | 2.5 km || 
|-id=954 bgcolor=#E9E9E9
| 387954 ||  || — || March 4, 2005 || Mount Lemmon || Mount Lemmon Survey || AGN || align=right | 1.1 km || 
|-id=955 bgcolor=#E9E9E9
| 387955 ||  || — || April 4, 2005 || Catalina || CSS || — || align=right | 2.5 km || 
|-id=956 bgcolor=#E9E9E9
| 387956 ||  || — || April 5, 2005 || Mount Lemmon || Mount Lemmon Survey || AGN || align=right | 1.7 km || 
|-id=957 bgcolor=#E9E9E9
| 387957 ||  || — || April 6, 2005 || Mount Lemmon || Mount Lemmon Survey || NEM || align=right | 2.4 km || 
|-id=958 bgcolor=#E9E9E9
| 387958 ||  || — || April 2, 2005 || Catalina || CSS || — || align=right | 3.2 km || 
|-id=959 bgcolor=#E9E9E9
| 387959 ||  || — || April 7, 2005 || Kitt Peak || Spacewatch || DOR || align=right | 2.8 km || 
|-id=960 bgcolor=#E9E9E9
| 387960 ||  || — || April 10, 2005 || Mount Lemmon || Mount Lemmon Survey || HOF || align=right | 2.5 km || 
|-id=961 bgcolor=#E9E9E9
| 387961 ||  || — || March 14, 2005 || Mount Lemmon || Mount Lemmon Survey || — || align=right | 2.2 km || 
|-id=962 bgcolor=#E9E9E9
| 387962 ||  || — || April 10, 2005 || Kitt Peak || Spacewatch || — || align=right | 2.2 km || 
|-id=963 bgcolor=#E9E9E9
| 387963 ||  || — || April 13, 2005 || Catalina || CSS || POS || align=right | 4.2 km || 
|-id=964 bgcolor=#E9E9E9
| 387964 ||  || — || April 12, 2005 || Kitt Peak || Spacewatch || GEF || align=right | 1.7 km || 
|-id=965 bgcolor=#E9E9E9
| 387965 ||  || — || April 15, 2005 || Catalina || CSS || — || align=right | 2.5 km || 
|-id=966 bgcolor=#E9E9E9
| 387966 ||  || — || April 10, 2005 || Kitt Peak || Spacewatch || — || align=right | 1.9 km || 
|-id=967 bgcolor=#E9E9E9
| 387967 ||  || — || April 16, 2005 || Kitt Peak || Spacewatch || — || align=right | 2.1 km || 
|-id=968 bgcolor=#E9E9E9
| 387968 ||  || — || May 4, 2005 || Siding Spring || SSS || HNA || align=right | 2.8 km || 
|-id=969 bgcolor=#d6d6d6
| 387969 ||  || — || May 3, 2005 || Kitt Peak || Spacewatch || KOR || align=right | 1.4 km || 
|-id=970 bgcolor=#E9E9E9
| 387970 ||  || — || May 4, 2005 || Mount Lemmon || Mount Lemmon Survey || — || align=right | 1.8 km || 
|-id=971 bgcolor=#d6d6d6
| 387971 ||  || — || May 7, 2005 || Mount Lemmon || Mount Lemmon Survey || KAR || align=right | 1.1 km || 
|-id=972 bgcolor=#E9E9E9
| 387972 ||  || — || May 4, 2005 || Kitt Peak || Spacewatch || — || align=right | 1.9 km || 
|-id=973 bgcolor=#d6d6d6
| 387973 ||  || — || May 3, 2005 || Kitt Peak || Spacewatch || — || align=right | 2.5 km || 
|-id=974 bgcolor=#E9E9E9
| 387974 ||  || — || May 10, 2005 || Cerro Tololo || M. W. Buie || AGN || align=right | 1.1 km || 
|-id=975 bgcolor=#FA8072
| 387975 ||  || — || June 4, 2005 || Catalina || CSS || — || align=right | 1.1 km || 
|-id=976 bgcolor=#E9E9E9
| 387976 ||  || — || June 4, 2005 || Reedy Creek || J. Broughton || — || align=right | 2.8 km || 
|-id=977 bgcolor=#d6d6d6
| 387977 ||  || — || June 15, 2005 || Mount Lemmon || Mount Lemmon Survey || — || align=right | 2.5 km || 
|-id=978 bgcolor=#fefefe
| 387978 ||  || — || June 27, 2005 || Kitt Peak || Spacewatch || V || align=right data-sort-value="0.82" | 820 m || 
|-id=979 bgcolor=#d6d6d6
| 387979 ||  || — || July 2, 2005 || Kitt Peak || Spacewatch || — || align=right | 4.1 km || 
|-id=980 bgcolor=#d6d6d6
| 387980 ||  || — || July 5, 2005 || Mount Lemmon || Mount Lemmon Survey || — || align=right | 1.9 km || 
|-id=981 bgcolor=#d6d6d6
| 387981 ||  || — || June 15, 2005 || Mount Lemmon || Mount Lemmon Survey || — || align=right | 4.0 km || 
|-id=982 bgcolor=#d6d6d6
| 387982 ||  || — || July 4, 2005 || Mount Lemmon || Mount Lemmon Survey || EOS || align=right | 2.2 km || 
|-id=983 bgcolor=#d6d6d6
| 387983 ||  || — || July 7, 2005 || Kitt Peak || Spacewatch || EOS || align=right | 2.0 km || 
|-id=984 bgcolor=#d6d6d6
| 387984 ||  || — || July 31, 2005 || Mauna Kea || P. A. Wiegert || — || align=right | 2.5 km || 
|-id=985 bgcolor=#fefefe
| 387985 ||  || — || August 24, 2005 || Palomar || NEAT || — || align=right | 1.1 km || 
|-id=986 bgcolor=#fefefe
| 387986 ||  || — || August 25, 2005 || Palomar || NEAT || NYS || align=right data-sort-value="0.66" | 660 m || 
|-id=987 bgcolor=#fefefe
| 387987 ||  || — || August 25, 2005 || Palomar || NEAT || FLO || align=right data-sort-value="0.70" | 700 m || 
|-id=988 bgcolor=#fefefe
| 387988 ||  || — || August 26, 2005 || Palomar || NEAT || — || align=right | 1.00 km || 
|-id=989 bgcolor=#fefefe
| 387989 ||  || — || August 28, 2005 || Kitt Peak || Spacewatch || — || align=right data-sort-value="0.78" | 780 m || 
|-id=990 bgcolor=#fefefe
| 387990 ||  || — || August 25, 2005 || Palomar || NEAT || — || align=right data-sort-value="0.76" | 760 m || 
|-id=991 bgcolor=#d6d6d6
| 387991 ||  || — || August 26, 2005 || Palomar || NEAT || — || align=right | 2.8 km || 
|-id=992 bgcolor=#d6d6d6
| 387992 ||  || — || August 27, 2005 || Anderson Mesa || LONEOS || EUP || align=right | 5.3 km || 
|-id=993 bgcolor=#fefefe
| 387993 ||  || — || August 25, 2005 || Palomar || NEAT || NYS || align=right data-sort-value="0.62" | 620 m || 
|-id=994 bgcolor=#fefefe
| 387994 ||  || — || August 29, 2005 || Socorro || LINEAR || NYS || align=right data-sort-value="0.70" | 700 m || 
|-id=995 bgcolor=#d6d6d6
| 387995 ||  || — || August 25, 2005 || Palomar || NEAT || — || align=right | 3.1 km || 
|-id=996 bgcolor=#d6d6d6
| 387996 ||  || — || August 27, 2005 || Palomar || NEAT || — || align=right | 3.2 km || 
|-id=997 bgcolor=#fefefe
| 387997 ||  || — || August 27, 2005 || Palomar || NEAT || FLO || align=right data-sort-value="0.80" | 800 m || 
|-id=998 bgcolor=#d6d6d6
| 387998 ||  || — || August 27, 2005 || Palomar || NEAT || — || align=right | 3.7 km || 
|-id=999 bgcolor=#d6d6d6
| 387999 ||  || — || August 27, 2005 || Palomar || NEAT || ALA || align=right | 4.8 km || 
|-id=000 bgcolor=#d6d6d6
| 388000 ||  || — || August 28, 2005 || Kitt Peak || Spacewatch || — || align=right | 2.7 km || 
|}

References

External links 
 Discovery Circumstances: Numbered Minor Planets (385001)–(390000) (IAU Minor Planet Center)

0387